= Metal–nitride–oxide–semiconductor transistor =

The metal–nitride–oxide–semiconductor or metal–nitride–oxide–silicon (MNOS) transistor is a type of MOSFET (metal–oxide–semiconductor field-effect transistor) in which the oxide layer is replaced by a double layer of nitride and oxide. It is an alternative and supplement to the existing standard MOS technology, wherein the insulation employed is a nitride-oxide layer. It is used in non-volatile computer memory.

== History ==
The first silicon dioxide transistors were developed by Frosch and Derick in 1957 at Bell Labs.

In late 1967, a Sperry research team led by H.A. Richard Wegener invented the metal–nitride–oxide–semiconductor (MNOS) transistor, a type of MOSFET in which the oxide layer is replaced by a double layer of nitride and oxide. Nitride was used as a trapping layer instead of a floating gate, but its use was limited as it was considered inferior to a floating gate.

Charge trap (CT) memory was introduced with MNOS devices in the late 1960s. It had a device structure and operating principles similar to floating-gate (FG) memory, but the main difference is that the charges are stored in a conducting material (typically a doped polysilicon layer) in FG memory, whereas CT memory stored charges in localized traps within a dielectric layer (typically made of silicon nitride).

== See also ==
- Field-effect transistor
- MISFET
- MOSFET
- SONOS
