= Ian Munro Ross =

- Born: August 15, 1927; Southport, England
- Died: March 10, 2013 (aged 85); New Smyrna Beach, Florida
- Education: Cambridge University (B.A.; M.A.; Ph.D)
- Known for: FeFET; Epitaxy; JFET
- Awards: IEEE Founders Medal (1988); IRI Medal (1987); IEEE Morris N. Liebmann Memorial Award (1963)

Ian Munro Ross FREng (15 August 1927 – 10 March 2013) was an early pioneer in transistors, and for 12 years President of Bell Labs.

Ross was born in Southport, England, and in 1948 received his bachelor's degree in electrical engineering from Gonville and Caius College, Cambridge. In 1952 he received his M.A. and PhD degrees in electrical engineering from Cambridge.

In 1952 William Shockley hired him to work in semiconductors at Bell Labs, and he arrived in Murray Hill just after John Bardeen and Walter Houser Brattain had left. Shockley's group focused exclusively on transistor improvements, and Ross and G. C. Dacey were instrumental in the early stages of development of the field-effect transistor. In 1960 Ross and others invented epitaxy. He subsequently rose through managerial ranks, ultimately serving as the sixth President of Bell Labs 1979–1991 and overseeing its reorganization following the breakup of the Bell System.

In 1979, he was a resident of Rumson, New Jersey.

Ross was a member of the National Academy of Engineering, National Academy of Sciences, and Royal Academy of Engineering, and a fellow of the American Association for the Advancement of Science and the Institute of Electrical and Electronics Engineers. He received the 1963 IEEE Morris N. Liebmann Memorial Award "for contributions to the development of the epitaxial transistor and other semiconductor devices", the 1987 IRI Medal from the Industrial Research Institute in recognition for his contributions to technology leadership, the 1988 IEEE Founders Medal "for distinguished leadership of AT&T Bell Laboratories guiding innovation in telecommunications and information processing", and the 2001 Bueche Award "for his contributions to semiconductor development, his leadership of engineering for communications networks and the Apollo program, and his role in shaping national policies affecting the semiconductor industry."

== Selected works ==
- G. C. Dacey and I. M. Ross, "Unipolar field-effect transistor", Proc. IRE 41, Aug. 1953, pp. 970–979.
- J. L. Moll, I. M. Ross, "The Dependence of Transistor Parameters on the Distribution of Base Layer Resistivity", Proc. IRE., vol. 44, 1956, page 72.
- G. C. Dacey and I. M. Ross, "Field Effect Transistor", Bell System Technical Journal, 34, page 1149, 1955.

== Sources ==
- IEEE biography
- Public Broadcasting Service biography
- Bueche Award biography
- Brinkman, W.F.; Haggan, D.E.; Troutman, W.W., "A history of the invention of the transistor and where it will lead us", IEEE Journal of Solid-State Circuits, Volume 32, Issue 12, Dec 1997, Pages 1858–1865.
- Alcatel-Lucent biography
