= Intel 1103 =

Early solid state memory

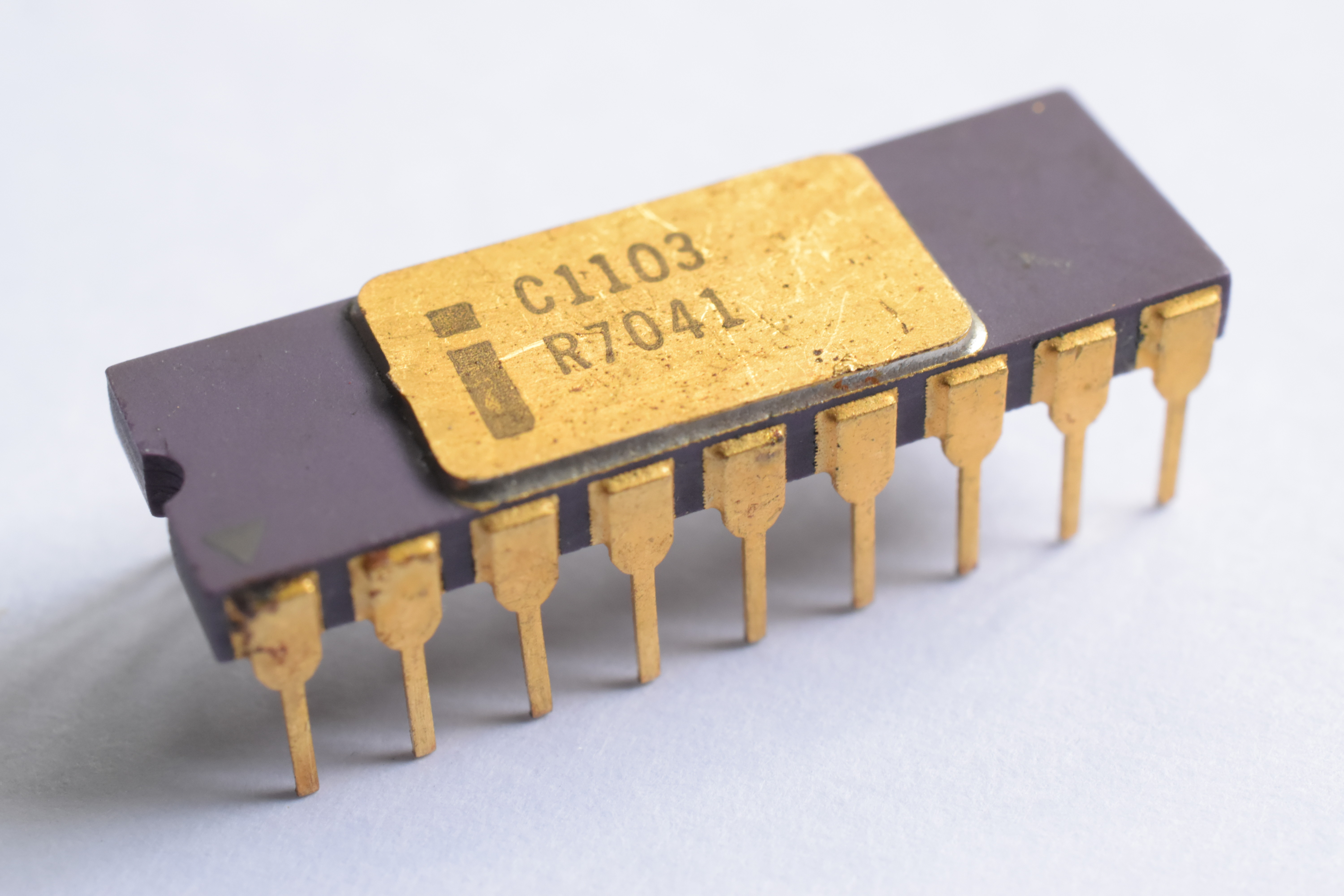
- A ceramic C1103 variant
- Media type: 8 μm p-MOS DRAM
- Capacity: 1 kilobit
- Standard: 18-pin DIP
- Developed by: Honeywell
- Manufactured by: Intel et al.
- Usage: HP 9800 series, PDP-11, MAXC and others
- Released: October 1970
- Discontinued: 1979

Intel 1103 pinout

The Intel 1103 is a dynamic random-access memory (DRAM) integrated circuit (IC) developed and fabricated by Intel. Introduced in October 1970, the 1103 was the first commercially available DRAM IC; and due to its small physical size and low price relative to magnetic-core memory, it replaced the latter in many applications. When it was introduced in 1970, initial production yields were poor, and it was not until the fifth stepping of the production masks that it became available in large quantities during 1971. Intel shipped the 250,000th 1103 RAM chip in June 1974.

== Development ==
In 1969 William Regitz and his colleagues at Honeywell invented a three-transistor dynamic memory cell and began to canvass the semiconductor industry for a producer. The recently founded Intel Corporation responded and developed two very similar 1024-bit chips, the 1102 and 1103, under the lead of Joel Karp, working closely with William Regitz. Ultimately only the 1103 went into production.

Microsystems International became the first second source for the 1103 in 1971. Later National Semiconductor, Signetics, and Synertek manufactured the 1103 as well.

== Technical details ==
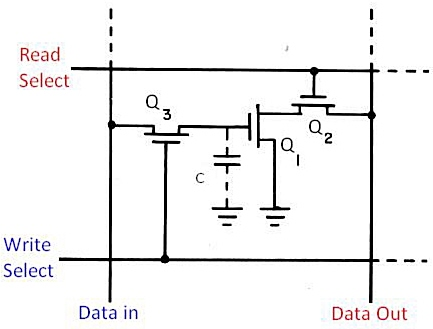
DRAM memory cell of Intel i1103 chip

t_{RWC}	580 ns	Random read or write cycle time (from one +ve Precharge edge to the next)
t_{PO}	300 ns	Access time: Precharge High to valid data out
t_{REF}	2 ms	Refresh time
V_{CC}	16 V	Supply voltage
p-MOS	8 μm	Production process (silicon gate MOSFET)
Capacity	1024x1	Capacity x bus width
