= Volatile memory =

Computer memory that loses its contents when unpowered

Volatile memory, in contrast to non-volatile memory, is computer memory that requires power to maintain the stored information; it retains its contents while powered on but when the power is interrupted, the stored data is quickly lost.

Volatile memory has several uses, including as primary storage. In addition to usually being faster than forms of mass storage such as a hard disk drive, volatility can protect sensitive information, as it becomes unavailable on power-down. Most general-purpose random-access memory (RAM) is volatile.

== Types ==
There are two kinds of volatile RAM: dynamic and static. Even though both types need continuous electrical current to retain data, there are some important differences between them. Dynamic RAM (DRAM) is very popular due to its cost-effectiveness. DRAM stores each bit of information in a different capacitor within the integrated circuit. DRAM chips need just one single capacitor and one transistor to store each bit of information. This makes it space-efficient and inexpensive.

The main advantage of static RAM (SRAM) is that it is much faster than dynamic RAM. Its disadvantage is its high price. SRAM does not need continuous electrical refreshes, but it still requires constant current to sustain the difference in voltage. Every single bit in a static RAM chip needs a cell of six transistors, whereas dynamic RAM requires only one capacitor and one transistor. As a result, SRAM is unable to accomplish the storage capabilities of the DRAM family. SRAM is commonly used as CPU cache and for processor registers and in networking devices.

== See also ==
Non-volatile memory
