= Eli Harari =

American business executive and founder of SanDisk

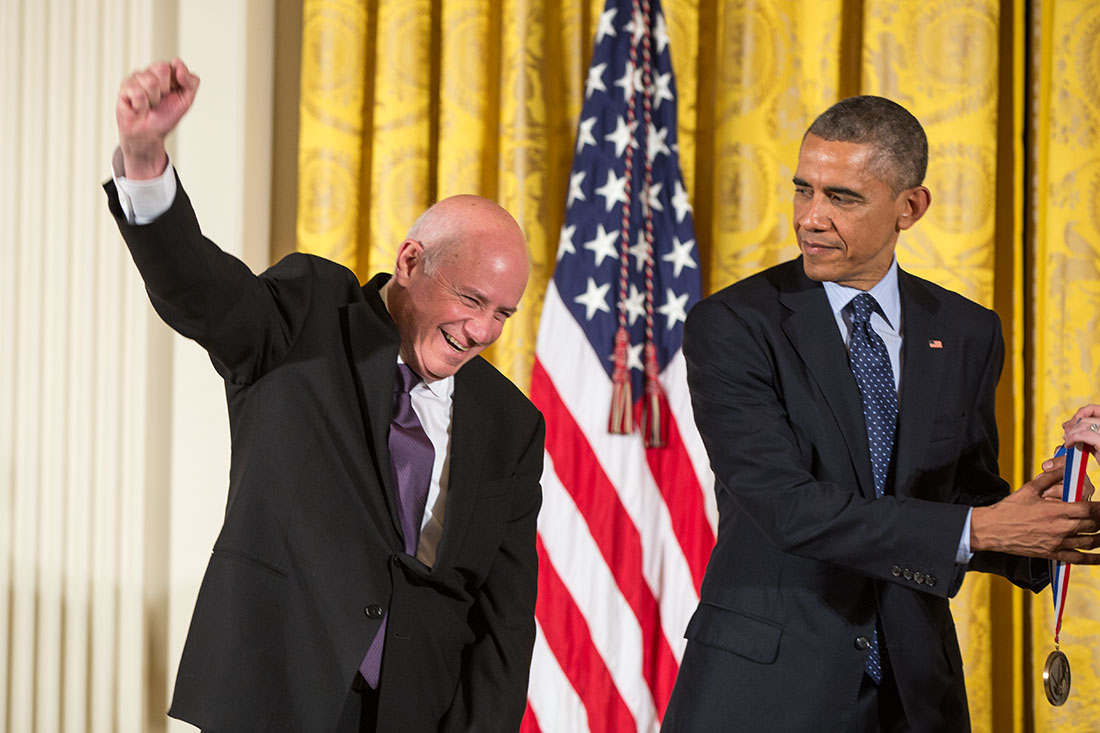
Harari receiving the National Medal of Technology and Innovation (2014)

Eliyahou Harari is an Israeli-American business executive best known for being the co-founder of SanDisk along with Jack Yuan and Sanjay Mehrotra.

== Early life and education ==
Harari was born in 1945 in Tel Aviv, Israel. His parents were Polish Jews who at 1933 had immigrated to Mandatory Palestine.

He was born and raised in Israel. He completed his Bachelor's Degree at Manchester University in England. He completed his PhD degree in mechanical and aerospace engineering at Princeton University and his subject of study was semiconductors.

== Career ==
=== Hughes Aircraft ===
As an engineering intern at Hughes Aircraft, he played a major role in the development of the world's first EEPROM.

=== Intel ===
His first job after graduating university was at Intel. He later went to work for a number of startups, including Synertek, Wafer Scale Integration and San Disk.

=== SanDisk ===
He, Jack Yuan and Sanjay Mehrotra co-founded SanDisk in 1988.

== Awards and recognition ==
He has more than 180 patents. He has received numerous awards including:

- 2006 IEEE Reynold B. Johnson Data Storage Device Technology Award
- 2009 Robert N. Noyce Medal
- 2014 National Medal of Technology
- He has been inducted into the National Inventors Hall of Fame
