= Non-volatile memory =

Computer memory that does not lose its contents after being turned off

Non-volatile memory (NVM) or non-volatile storage is a type of computer memory that can retain stored information even after power is removed. In contrast, volatile memory needs constant power in order to retain data.

Non-volatile memory typically refers to storage in memory chips, which store data in floating-gate memory cells consisting of floating-gate MOSFETs (metal–oxide–semiconductor field-effect transistors), including flash memory storage such as NAND flash and solid-state drives (SSD).

Other examples of non-volatile memory include read-only memory (ROM), EPROM (erasable programmable ROM) and EEPROM (electrically erasable programmable ROM), ferroelectric RAM, most types of computer data storage devices (e.g. disk storage, hard disk drives, optical discs, floppy disks, and magnetic tape), and early computer storage methods such as punched tape and cards.

== Overview ==
Non-volatile memory is typically used for the task of secondary storage or long-term persistent storage. The most widely used form of primary storage today is a volatile form of random access memory (RAM), meaning that when the computer is shut down, anything contained in RAM is lost. However, most forms of non-volatile memory have limitations that make them unsuitable for use as primary storage. Typically, non-volatile memory costs more, provides lower performance, or has a limited lifetime compared to volatile random access memory.

Non-volatile data storage can be categorized into electrically addressed systems, for example, flash memory, and read-only memory) and mechanically addressed systems (hard disks, optical discs, magnetic tape, holographic memory, and such). Generally speaking, electrically addressed systems are expensive, and have limited capacity, but are fast, whereas mechanically addressed systems cost less per bit, but are slower.

== Electrically addressed ==
Electrically addressed semiconductor non-volatile memories can be categorized according to their write mechanism.

=== Read-only and read-mostly devices ===
Mask ROMs are factory programmable only and typically used for large-volume products that are not required to be updated after the memory device is manufactured.

Programmable read-only memory (PROM) can be altered once after the memory device is manufactured using a PROM programmer. Programming is often done before the device is installed in its target system, typically an embedded system. The programming is permanent, and further changes require the replacement of the device. Data is stored by physically altering (burning) storage sites in the device.

An EPROM is an erasable ROM that can be changed more than once. However, writing new data to an EPROM requires a special programmer circuit. EPROMs have a quartz window that allows them to be erased with ultraviolet light, but the whole device is cleared at one time. A one-time programmable (OTP) device may be implemented using an EPROM chip without the quartz window; this is less costly to manufacture. An electrically erasable programmable read-only memory EEPROM uses voltage to erase memory. These erasable memory devices require a significant amount of time to erase data and write new data; they are not usually configured to be programmed by the processor of the target system. Data is stored using floating-gate transistors, which require special operating voltages to trap or release electric charge on an insulated control gate to store information.

=== Flash memory ===
Flash memory is a solid-state chip that maintains stored data without any external power source. It is a close relative of EEPROM; it differs in that erase operations must be done on a block basis, and its capacity is substantially larger than that of an EEPROM. Flash memory devices use two different technologies—NOR and NAND—to map data. NOR flash provides high-speed random access, reading and writing data in specific memory locations; it can retrieve as little as a single byte. NAND flash reads and writes sequentially at high speed, handling data in blocks. However, it is slower at reading when compared to NOR. NAND flash reads faster than it writes, quickly transferring whole pages of data. Less expensive than NOR flash at high densities, NAND technology offers higher capacity for the same-sized silicon.

=== Ferroelectric RAM (F-RAM) ===
Ferroelectric RAM (FeRAM, F-RAM or FRAM) is a form of random-access memory similar in construction to DRAM; both use a capacitor and transistor but instead of using a simple dielectric layer in the capacitor, an F-RAM cell contains a thin ferroelectric film of lead zirconate titanate [Pb(Zr,Ti)O_{3}], commonly referred to as PZT. The Zr/Ti atoms in the PZT change polarity in an electric field, thereby producing a binary switch. Due to the PZT crystal maintaining polarity, F-RAM retains its data memory when power is shut off or interrupted.

Due to this crystal structure and how it is influenced, F-RAM offers distinct properties from other nonvolatile memory options, including extremely high, although not infinite, endurance (exceeding 10^{16} read/write cycles for 3.3 V devices), ultra-low power consumption (since F-RAM does not require a charge pump like other non-volatile memories), single-cycle write speeds, and gamma radiation tolerance.

=== Magnetoresistive RAM (MRAM) ===
Magnetoresistive RAM stores data in magnetic storage elements called magnetic tunnel junctions (MTJs). The first generation of MRAM, such as Everspin Technologies' 4 Mbit, utilized field-induced writing. The second generation is developed mainly through two approaches: Thermal-assisted switching (TAS) which is being developed by Crocus Technology, and Spin-transfer torque (STT) which Crocus, Hynix, IBM, and several other companies are developing.

=== Phase-change memory (PCM) ===
Phase-change memory stores data in chalcogenide glass, which can reversibly change the phase between the amorphous and the crystalline state, accomplished by heating and cooling the glass. The crystalline state has low resistance, and the amorphous phase has high resistance, which allows currents to be switched ON and OFF to represent digital 1 and 0 states.

=== FeFET memory ===
FeFET memory uses a transistor with ferroelectric material to permanently retain state.

=== RRAM memory ===
RRAM (ReRAM) works by changing the resistance across a dielectric solid-state material, often referred to as a memristor. ReRAM involves generating defects in a thin oxide layer, known as oxygen vacancies (oxide bond locations where the oxygen has been removed), which can subsequently charge and drift under an electric field. The motion of oxygen ions and vacancies in the oxide would be analogous to the motion of electrons and holes in a semiconductor.

Although ReRAM was initially seen as a replacement technology for flash memory, the cost and performance benefits of ReRAM have not been enough for companies to proceed with the replacement. Apparently, a broad range of materials can be used for ReRAM. However, the discovery that the popular high-κ gate dielectric HfO_{2} can be used as a low-voltage ReRAM has encouraged researchers to investigate more possibilities.

== Mechanically addressed systems ==
Mechanically addressed systems use a recording head to read and write on a designated storage medium. Since the access time depends on the physical location of the data on the device, mechanically addressed systems may be sequential access. For example, magnetic tape stores data as a sequence of bits on a long tape; transporting the tape past the recording head is required to access any part of the storage. Tape media can be removed from the drive and stored, giving indefinite capacity at the cost of the time required to retrieve a dismounted tape.

Hard disk drives use a rotating magnetic disk to store data; access time is longer than for semiconductor memory, but the cost per stored data bit is very low, and they provide random access to any location on the disk. Formerly, removable disk packs were common, allowing storage capacity to be expanded. Optical discs store data by altering a pigment layer on a plastic disk and are similarly random access. Read-only and read-write versions are available; removable media again allows indefinite expansion, and some automated systems (e.g., optical jukebox) were used to retrieve and mount disks under direct program control.

Domain-wall memory (DWM) stores data in a magnetic tunnel junctions (MTJs), which works by controlling domain wall (DW) motion in ferromagnetic nanowires.

== Organic ==
Thinfilm produces rewriteable non-volatile organic ferroelectric memory based on ferroelectric polymers. Thinfilm successfully demonstrated roll-to-roll printed memories in 2009. In Thinfilm's organic memory the ferroelectric polymer is sandwiched between two sets of electrodes in a passive matrix. Each crossing of metal lines is a ferroelectric capacitor and defines a memory cell.

== Non-volatile main memory ==
Non-volatile main memory (NVMM) is primary storage with non-volatile attributes. This application of non-volatile memory presents security challenges. NVDIMM is one example of the non-volatile main memory.
