= Lee Seon-woo =

Lee Seon-woo may refer to:

- Infiltration (gamer), South Korean esports player
- Lee Seon-woo (volleyball), South Korean volleyball player
- Sun Woo Lee, South Korean business executive
