= MoSys =

Defunct American semiconductor company

MoSys, Inc.
- Formerly: Monolithic System Technology (1991–2006)
- Type: Public
- Industry: Semiconductor
- Founded: September 16, 1991; 34 years ago in San Jose, California
- Founder: Fu-Chieh Hsu
- Defunct: December 20, 2021; 4 years ago
- Fate: Merger with Peraso Technologies
- Products: Multibank DRAM; 1T-SRAM
- Website: mosys.com at the Wayback Machine (archived December 5, 1998)

MoSys, Inc., originally Monolithic System Technology (MoST), was a fabless semiconductor design company founded in 1991. The company primarily designed memory chips and was especially known for its Multibank DRAM and 1T-SRAM technologies—the latter used on Nintendo's Wii and GameCube video game consoles.

== History ==
MoSys was incorporated in San Jose, California, on September 16, 1991, as Monolithic System Technology. The company was co-founded by Fu-Chieh Hsu, who also served as its chairman and president until December 2004. Joined by Fu-Chieh were Wingyu Leung and Gary Banta, both vice presidents of design engineering. The initial design team staffed engineers poached from Integrated Device Technology, ISSI, Rambus, and Plus Logic. By 1994, the company had received $7.5 million in venture funding.

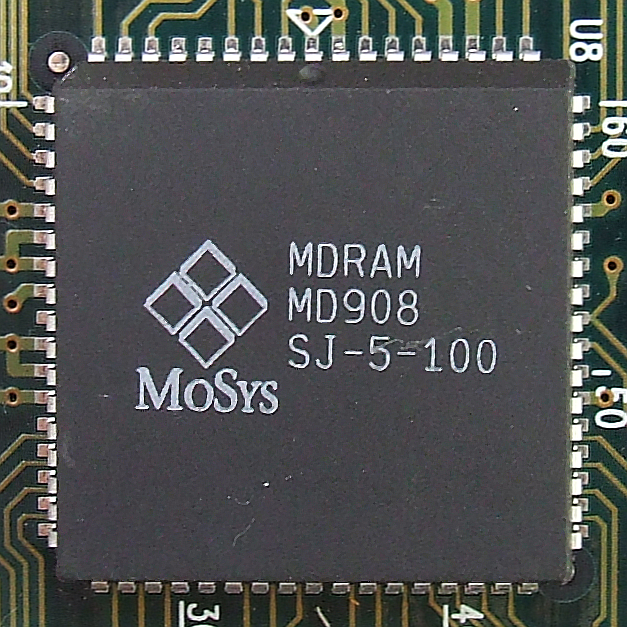
MoSys MDRAM MD908

The company's first major product was a specialized type of dynamic random-access memory that Monolithic termed Multibank DRAM (MDRAM). The initial entry in this series of chips was a 4-Mb chip, composed of 16 cells of 16-bit-wide 16-kB memory; a simple interface on each of the cells connects them to a high-speed bus on the chip. On each leading edge and trailing edge of the chip-enable pulse, memory arrays output data onto the internal bus, achieving a 32-bit word on every pulse. MDRAM secured design wins in July 1994 with Tseng Labs, Trident Microsystems, and S3 Inc. using the chips in their graphics accelerator cards. Access time was rated at 15 ns, compared to 60 ns of contemporary chips. MDRAM required a proprietary interface and could not be adapted to the SIMM card standard for desktop computer memory of its day. Volume production, handled by an outside fabricator, was achieved in late 1994.

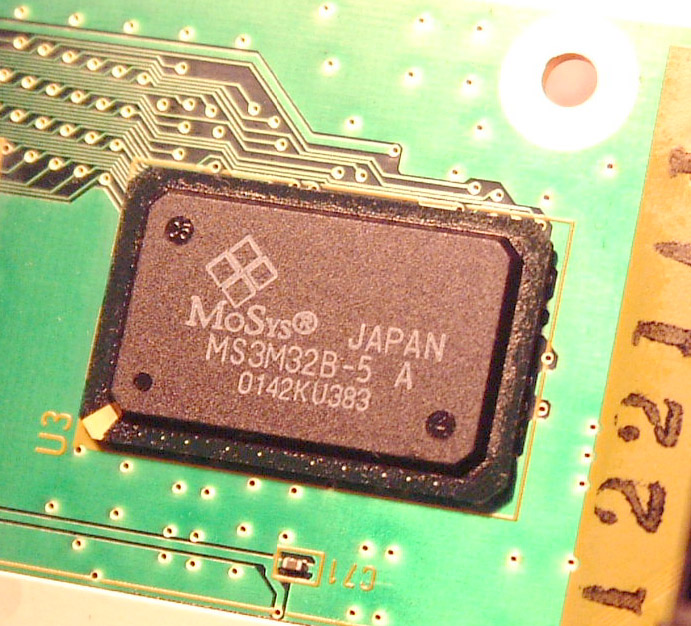
MoSys 1T-SRAM chip

In July 1998, Monolithic introduced a series of pipelined-burst static RAM chips for the notebook computer market. In September 1998, it introduced 1T-SRAM, a pseudo-static random-access memory technology. Unlike true static RAM, 1T-SRAM is essentially dynamic RAM, which requires each memory cell to be refreshed constantly. However, 1T-SRAM pairs each bank of cells with true SRAM cache of the same capacity; when more than one read/write operation occurs within a bank, the on-chip memory controller redirects access to the cache, allowing the cells within the bank to be refreshed. All banks not involved in a given transaction are meanwhile refreshed in the background. This effectively achieves SRAM-like performance, without the need for wait states for every recharge cycle. The 1T in 1T-SRAM stands for 1 transistor; in dynamic RAM, typically only one transistor–capacitor pair is needed to build one memory cell, while static RAM commonly requires six transistors. The academics Bruce Jacob, Spencer W. Ng, David T. Wang, writing in the book Memory Systems (2008), called the name a misnomer: "[1-transistor static RAM] is not really possible, but it makes for a catchy name".

In 1999, Nintendo signed a contract with MoSys to use 1T-SRAM in its codenamed Dolphin video game console, later unveiled as the GameCube in 2001. Over 25 million units of 1T-SRAM were produced up to October 2002. A newer version of 1T-SRAM, dubbed 1T-SRAM Classic, was patented and introduced in 2006. Nintendo re-entered a contract with Monolithic to use it in the Wii, in 2006.

The company began narrowing its chip sales in 1998, in favor of licensing its patents to other semiconductor memory companies. In September 2000, Monolithic's board members voted to reincorporate the company in Delaware. The company still operated within California, relocating its research office to nearby Sunnyvale by June 2001. The same month, the company filed its initial public offering, mediated through A. G. Edwards. The company's stock rose 12 percent within the first day of its launch, leading to a net proceed of $51 million for Monolithic. The Wall Street Journal saw this as a rekindling of interest in technology companies in the stock market, which had fallen in the twilight of the dot-com bubble.

In September 2002, MoSys acquired Ottawa-based memory design company Atmos Corporation, which had been developing embedded DRAM compilers that would compete with MoSys 1T-SRAM solutions.

In February 2004, Synopsys announced that it would acquire Monolithic for US$432 million. However, a month later, Synopsys terminated its agreement to buy out Monolithic and paid the company a $10 million termination fee as part of the merger contract. This came after TSMC showed slides of their embedded high density memory roadmap at their public technology forum. A disgruntled former MoSys licensing manager laid off by Fu-Chieh asked questions about it being supported beyond 90nm technology. Synopsys marketing executives were present in the room and ran out of the room realizing the licensing potential for future generation semiconductors fabricated at TSMC would end. Synopsys attempted to terminate the purchase agreement with a hand delivered letter, but employees at MoSys locked the doors. Monolithic followed with a lawsuit in Delaware courts seeking to force Synopsys to finish its acquisition. Monolithic dropped the suit in July 2004 without payment or liability. In late December 2004, following ill-health and a tough year for the company, chairman Fu-Chieh resigned from Monolithic, with chief financial officer Mark Voll taking the mantle.

Monolithic had, by the end of 2005, 76 full-time employees—25 executives in Delaware and 51 engineers in the company's research and development lab in Sunnyvale. In May 2006, the company formally renamed itself to MoSys.

By the late 2010s MoSys had pivoted to designing chips for security, telecommunications, and datacenters. In December 2021, it merged with Peraso Technologies, a designer of mmWave semiconductors, to emerge as Peraso Inc.
