= Current sense amplifier =

Type of amplifier

Current sense amplifiers (also called current shunt amplifiers) are special-purpose amplifiers that output a voltage proportional to the current flowing in a power rail. They utilize a "current-sense resistor" to convert the load current in the power rail to a small voltage, which is then amplified by the current-sense amplifiers. The currents in the power rail can be in the range of 1 A to 20 A, requiring the current-sense resistor to be a resistor typically in the range of 1 to 100 mΩ. These amplifiers are designed to amplify a very small "sense voltage" of 10 to 100 mV, in the presence of very large common-mode voltages of 5 to 30 V. DC precision (low input offset voltage) and high common-mode rejection ratio (CMRR) are distinguishing characteristics of these amplifiers. Some current sense amplifiers measure current flowing in a single direction; bidirectional amplifiers measure current flow in both directions through the sense resistor.

Normal differential amplifiers and operational amplifiers powered between two power supply rails (say V_{CC} and V_{EE}) can only handle signals that lie between these two power rails. If a voltage outside the power supply rails is applied to the input, internal ESD protection diodes turn on, causing large currents to flow and damage these parts.

Specialised current-sense amplifiers, by contrast are designed so that, when powered from a low-voltage power rail such as V_{CC} = 5 V and V_{EE} = 0 V, they can withstand pin voltages much higher than V_{CC} and much lower than V_{EE}. These amplifiers use specialized ESD structures that enable them to have this functionality. Their input stages are designed such that when the input common-mode voltage is much higher than V_{CC} or much lower than V_{EE}, the input amplifier stage powers itself from the input common-mode voltage instead of V_{CC} orV_{EE}.

Examples of integrated current-sense amplifiers include INA240, INA293, LTC6101, MAX4080, AD8210, TS1100 and INA193. In special cases, no V_{CC} pin is required to accomplish current-sensing; the MAX9938 is such a device.

== See also ==
- Differential amplifier
- Shunts (electrical)
- Sense Amplifier
