= Dynamic random-access memory =

Type of computer memory

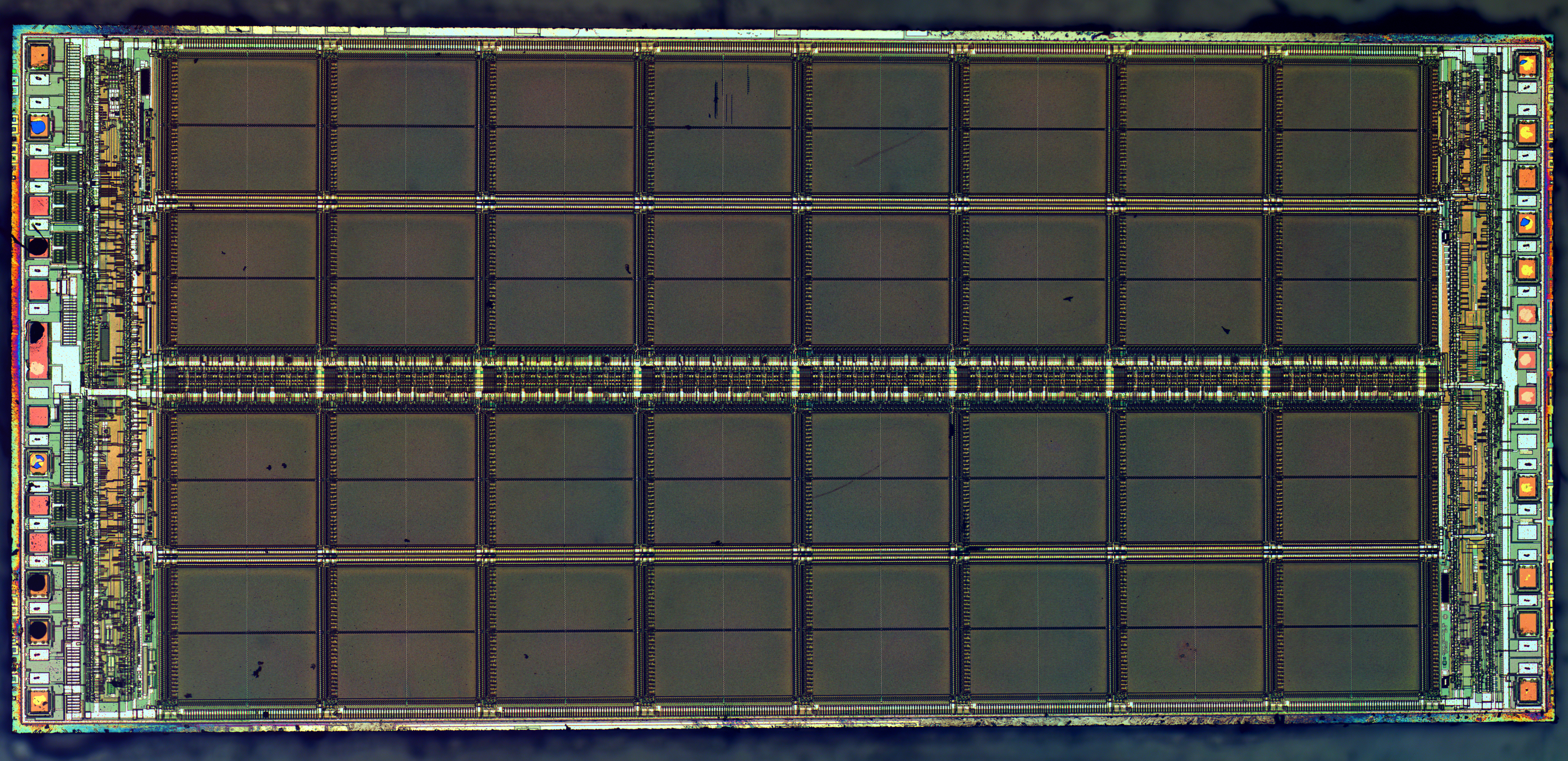
A die photograph of the Micron Technology MT4C1024 DRAM integrated circuit (1994). It has a capacity of 1 megabit equivalent to 2^{20} bits or 128 KiB.

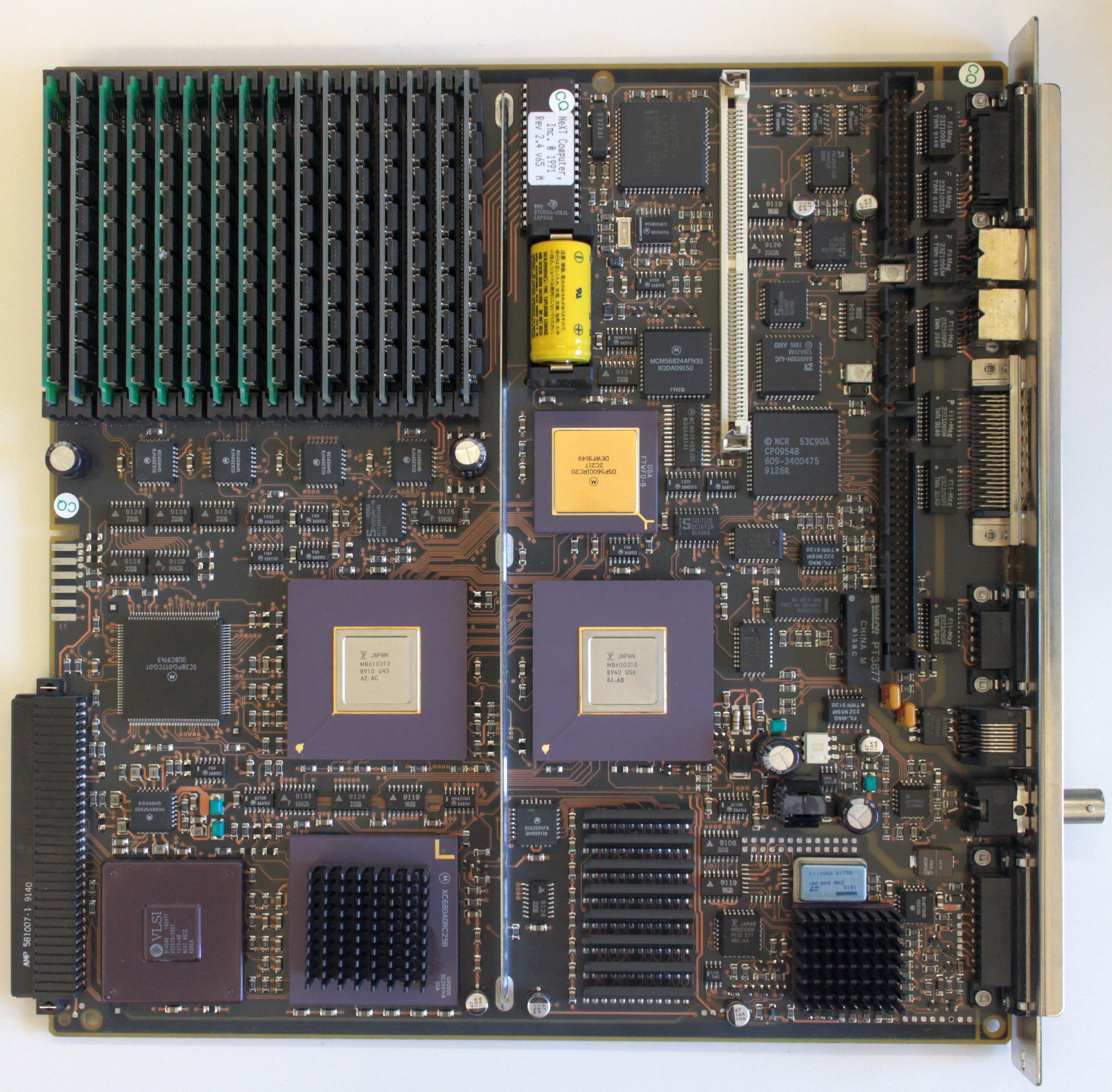
Motherboard of the NeXTcube computer, 1990, with 64 MiB main memory DRAM (top left) and 256 KiB of VRAM (lower edge, right of middle)

Dynamic random-access memory (dynamic RAM or DRAM) is a type of random-access semiconductor memory that stores each bit of data in a memory cell. A DRAM memory cell usually consists of a microscopic capacitor and a transistor, both typically based on metal–oxide–semiconductor (MOS) technology.

While most DRAM memory cell designs use a capacitor and transistor, some only use two transistors. In the designs where a capacitor is used, the capacitor can either be charged or discharged; these two states are taken to represent the two values of a bit, conventionally called 0 and 1. The electric charge on the capacitors gradually leaks away; without intervention, the data on the capacitor would soon be lost. To prevent this, DRAM requires an external memory refresh circuit which periodically rewrites the data in the capacitors, restoring them to their original charge. This refresh process is the defining characteristic of dynamic random-access memory, in contrast to static random-access memory (SRAM) which does not require data to be refreshed. Unlike flash memory, DRAM is volatile memory (as opposed to non-volatile memory), since it loses its data quickly when power is removed. However, DRAM does exhibit limited data remanence.

DRAM typically takes the form of an integrated circuit chip, which can consist of dozens to billions of DRAM memory cells. DRAM chips are widely used in digital electronics where low-cost, high-capacity computer memory is required. One of the largest applications for DRAM is the main memory (colloquially called the RAM) in modern computers and graphics cards (where the main memory is called the graphics memory). It is also used in many portable devices and video game consoles. In contrast, SRAM, which is faster and more expensive than DRAM, is typically used where speed is of greater concern than cost and size, such as the cache memories in processors.

The need to refresh DRAM demands more complicated circuitry and timing than SRAM. This complexity is offset by the structural simplicity of DRAM memory cells: only one transistor and a capacitor are required per bit, compared to four or six transistors in SRAM. This allows DRAM to reach very high densities with a simultaneous reduction in cost per bit. Refreshing the data consumes power, causing a variety of techniques to be used to manage the overall power consumption. For this reason, DRAM usually needs to operate with a memory controller; the memory controller needs to know DRAM parameters, especially memory timings, to initialize DRAMs, which may be different depending on different DRAM manufacturers and part numbers.

In 2017, DRAM had a 47% increase in the price-per-bit, the largest jump in 30 years since a 45% jump in 1988. In 2018, a "key characteristic of the DRAM market" was that there were "only three major suppliers — Micron Technology, SK Hynix and Samsung Electronics" that were "keeping a pretty tight rein on their capacity". In early 2026, DRAM (DDR4, DDR, and flash memory/NAND) prices have "experienced compounded increases, some exceeding 200%, since early 2025 .. [because of] unprecedented demand coming from the AI sector .. HBM is crowding out commodity DRAM capacity. Micron noted a 3-to-1 conversion ratio between HBM and DDR5 wafer capacity, meaning every HBM ramp directly compresses general-purpose memory supply."

In October 2026, China's CXMT announced progress on a new chip design that can store more data in less space, raising concerns about competition for major manufacturers such as Micron, Samsung and SK Hynix.

Other manufacturers make and sell DIMMs but not the DRAM chips in them, such as Kingston Technology, and some manufacturers sell stacked DRAM (used e.g. in the fastest supercomputers on the exascale) separately, such as Viking Technology. Others sell such integrated into other products, such as Fujitsu into its CPUs, AMD in GPUs, and Nvidia, with HBM2 in some of their GPU chips.

== History ==
=== Precursors ===
A schematic drawing depicting the cross-section of the original one-transistor, one-capacitor NMOS DRAM cell. It was patented in 1968.

The cryptanalytic machine code-named Aquarius used at Bletchley Park during World War II incorporated a hard-wired dynamic memory. Paper tape was read and the characters on it "were remembered in a dynamic store". The store used a large bank of capacitors, which were either charged or not, a charged capacitor representing cross (1) and an uncharged capacitor dot (0). Since the charge gradually leaked away, a periodic pulse was applied to top up those still charged (hence the term dynamic).

In November 1965, Toshiba introduced a bipolar dynamic RAM for its electronic calculator Toscal BC-1411. In 1966, Tomohisa Yoshimaru and Hiroshi Komikawa from Toshiba applied for a Japanese patent of a memory circuit composed of several transistors and a capacitor, in 1967 they applied for a patent in the US.

The earliest forms of DRAM mentioned above used bipolar transistors. While it offered improved performance over magnetic-core memory, bipolar DRAM could not compete with the lower price of the then-dominant magnetic-core memory. Capacitors had also been used for earlier memory schemes, such as the drum of the Atanasoff–Berry Computer, the Williams tube and the Selectron tube.

=== Single MOS DRAM ===
In 1966, Dr. Robert Dennard invented modern DRAM architecture in which there's a single MOS transistor per capacitor, at the IBM Thomas J. Watson Research Center, while he was working on MOS memory and was trying to create an alternative to SRAM which required six MOS transistors for each bit of data. While examining the characteristics of MOS technology, he found it was capable of building capacitors, and that storing a charge or no charge on the MOS capacitor could represent the 1 and 0 of a bit, while the MOS transistor could control writing the charge to the capacitor. This led to his development of the single-transistor MOS DRAM memory cell. He filed a patent in 1967, and was granted U.S. patent number 3,387,286 in 1968. MOS memory offered higher performance, was cheaper, and consumed less power, than magnetic-core memory. The patent describes the invention: "Each cell is formed, in one embodiment, using a single field-effect transistor and a single capacitor."

MOS DRAM chips were commercialized in 1969 by Advanced Memory Systems, Inc., of Sunnyvale, CA. This 1024 bit chip was sold to Honeywell, Raytheon, Wang Laboratories, and others. The same year, Honeywell asked Intel to make a DRAM using a three-transistor cell that they had developed. This became the Intel 1102 in early 1970. However, the 1102 had many problems, prompting Intel to begin work on their own improved design, in secrecy to avoid conflict with Honeywell. This became the first commercially available DRAM, the Intel 1103, in October 1970, despite initial problems with low yield until the fifth revision of the masks. The 1103 was designed by Joel Karp and laid out by Pat Earhart. The masks were cut by Barbara Maness and Judy Garcia. MOS memory overtook magnetic-core memory as the dominant memory technology in the early 1970s.

The first DRAM with multiplexed row and column address lines was the Mostek MK4096 4 Kbit DRAM designed by Robert Proebsting and introduced in 1973. This addressing scheme uses the same address pins to receive the low half and the high half of the address of the memory cell being referenced, switching between the two halves on alternating bus cycles. This was a radical advance, effectively halving the number of address lines required, which enabled it to fit into packages with fewer pins, a cost advantage that grew with every jump in memory size. The MK4096 proved to be a very robust design for customer applications. At the 16 Kbit density, the cost advantage increased; the 16 Kbit Mostek MK4116 DRAM, introduced in 1976, achieved greater than 75% worldwide DRAM market share. However, as density increased to 64 Kbit in the early 1980s, Mostek and other US manufacturers were overtaken by Japanese DRAM manufacturers, which dominated the US and worldwide markets during the 1980s and 1990s.

Early in 1985, Gordon Moore decided to withdraw Intel from producing DRAM. By 1986, many, but not all, United States chip makers had stopped making DRAMs. Micron Technology and Texas Instruments continued to produce them commercially, and IBM produced them for internal use.

In 1985, when 64K DRAM memory chips were the most common memory chips used in computers, and when more than 60 percent of those chips were produced by Japanese companies, semiconductor makers in the United States accused Japanese companies of export dumping for the purpose of driving makers in the United States out of the commodity memory chip business. Prices for the 64K product plummeted to as low as 35 cents apiece from $3.50 within 18 months, with disastrous financial consequences for some U.S. firms. On 4 December 1985 the US Commerce Department's International Trade Administration ruled in favor of the complaint.

Synchronous dynamic random-access memory (SDRAM) was developed by Samsung. The first commercial SDRAM chip was the Samsung KM48SL2000, which had a capacity of 16 Mbit, and was introduced in 1992. The first commercial DDR SDRAM (double data rate SDRAM) memory chip was Samsung's 64 Mbit DDR SDRAM chip, released in 1998.

Later, in 2001, Japanese DRAM makers accused Korean DRAM manufacturers of dumping.

In 2002, the United States Department of Justice began an investigation which ultimately found several computer manufacturers guilty of DRAM price fixing.

== Principles of operation ==
The principles of operation for reading a simple 4 $\times$4 DRAM array

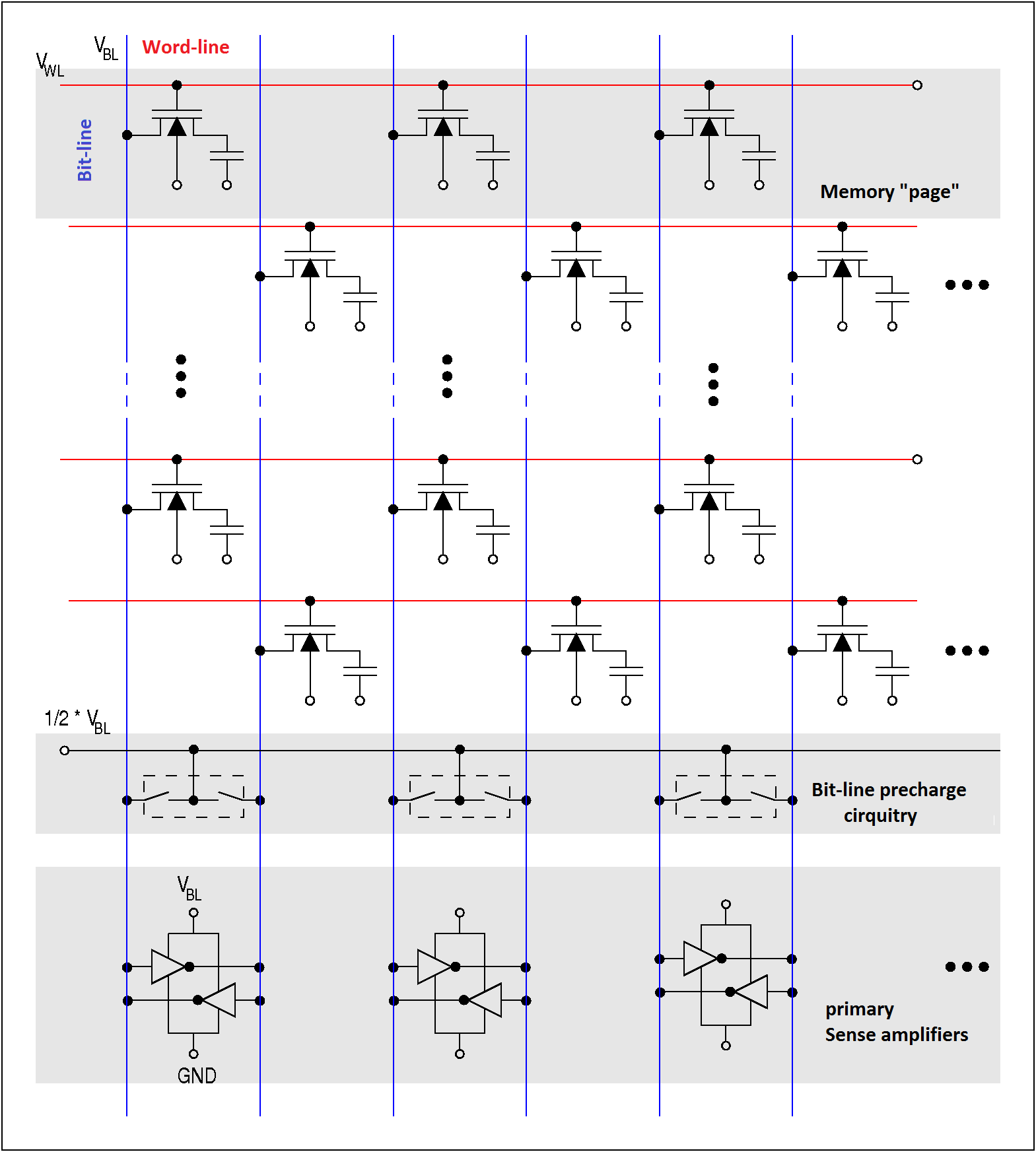
Basic structure of a DRAM cell array

DRAM is usually arranged in a rectangular array of charge storage cells consisting of one capacitor and transistor per data bit. The figure to the right shows a simple example with a four-by-four cell matrix. Some DRAM matrices are many thousands of cells in height and width.

The long horizontal lines connecting each row are known as word-lines. Each column of cells is composed of two bit-lines, each connected to every other storage cell in the column (the illustration to the right does not include this important detail). They are generally known as the + and − bit lines.

A sense amplifier is essentially a pair of cross-connected inverters between the bit lines. The first inverter is connected with input from the + bit-line and output to the − bit-line. The second inverter's input is from the − bit-line with output to the + bit-line. This results in positive feedback which stabilizes after one bit-line is fully at its highest voltage and the other bit-line is at the lowest possible voltage.

=== Operations to read a data bit from a DRAM storage cell ===
1. The sense amplifiers are disconnected.
2. The bit-lines are precharged to exactly equal voltages that are in between high and low logic levels (e.g., 0.5 V if the two levels are 0 and 1 V). The bit-lines are physically symmetrical to keep the capacitance equal, and therefore at this time their voltages are equal.
3. The precharge circuit is switched off. Because the bit-lines are relatively long, they have enough capacitance to maintain the precharged voltage for a brief time. This is an example of dynamic logic.
4. The desired row's word-line is then driven high to connect a cell's storage capacitor to its bit-line. This causes the transistor to conduct, transferring charge from the storage cell to the connected bit-line (if the stored value is 1) or from the connected bit-line to the storage cell (if the stored value is 0). Since the capacitance of the bit-line is typically much higher than the capacitance of the storage cell, the voltage on the bit-line increases very slightly if the storage cell's capacitor is discharged and decreases very slightly if the storage cell is charged (e.g., 0.54 and 0.45 V in the two cases). As the other bit-line holds 0.50 V there is a small voltage difference between the two twisted bit-lines.
5. The sense amplifiers are now connected to the bit-line pairs. Positive feedback then occurs from the cross-connected inverters, thereby amplifying the small voltage difference between the odd and even row bit-lines of a particular column until one bit line is fully at the lowest voltage and the other is at the maximum high voltage. Once this has happened, the row is open (the desired cell data is available).
6. All storage cells in the open row are sensed simultaneously, and the sense amplifier outputs latched. A column address then selects which latch bit to connect to the external data bus. Reads of different columns in the same row can be performed without a row opening delay because, for the open row, all data has already been sensed and latched.
7. While reading of columns in an open row is occurring, current is flowing back up the bit-lines from the output of the sense amplifiers and recharging the storage cells. This reinforces (i.e. refreshes) the charge in the storage cell by increasing the voltage in the storage capacitor if it was charged to begin with, or by keeping it discharged if it was empty. Note that due to the length of the bit lines, there is a fairly long propagation delay for the charge to be transferred back to the cell's capacitor. This takes significant time past the end of sense amplification, and thus overlaps with one or more column reads.
8. When done with reading all the columns in the current open row, the word-line is switched off to disconnect the storage cell capacitors (the row is closed) from the bit-lines. The sense amplifier is switched off, and the bit-lines are precharged again.

=== To write to memory ===
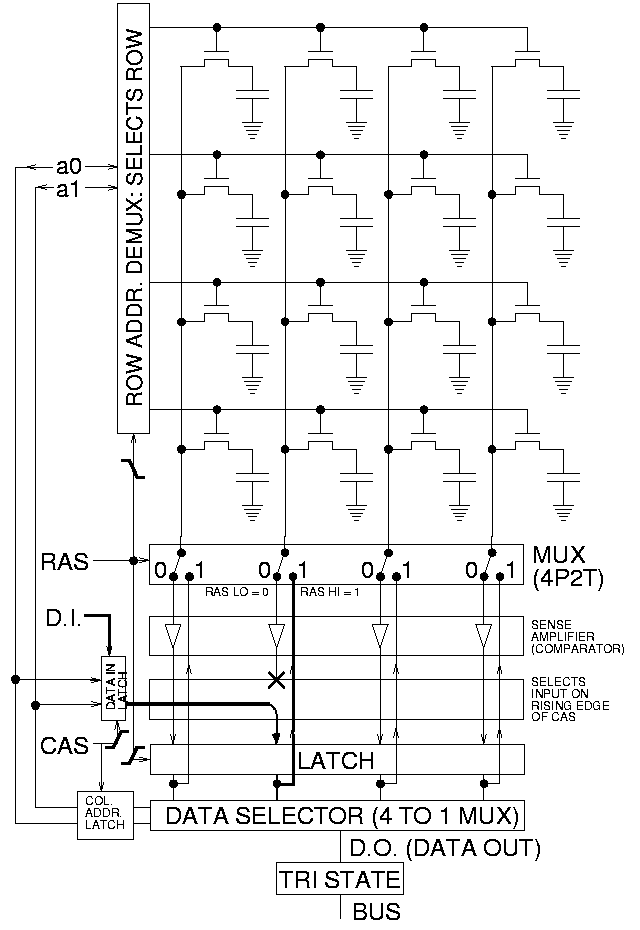
Writing to a DRAM cell

To store data, a row is opened and a given column's sense amplifier is temporarily forced to the desired high- or low-voltage state, thus causing the bit-line to charge or discharge the cell storage capacitor to the desired value. Due to the sense amplifier's positive feedback configuration, it will hold a bit-line at a stable voltage even after the forcing voltage is removed. During a write to a particular cell, all the columns in a row are sensed simultaneously just as during reading, so although only a single column's storage-cell capacitor charge is changed, the entire row is refreshed (written back in), as illustrated in the figure to the right.

=== Refresh rate ===
Typically, manufacturers specify that each row must be refreshed every 64 ms or less, as defined by the JEDEC standard.

Some systems refresh every row in a burst of activity involving all rows every 64 ms. Other systems refresh one row at a time, staggered throughout the 64 ms interval. For example, a system with 2^{13} = 8,192 rows would require a staggered refresh rate of one row every 7.8 μs, which is 64 ms divided by 8,192 rows. A few real-time systems refresh a portion of memory at a time determined by an external timer function that governs the operation of the rest of a system, such as the vertical blanking interval that occurs every 10–20 ms in video equipment.

The row address of the row that will be refreshed next is maintained by external logic or a counter within the DRAM. A system that provides the row address (and the refresh command) does so to have greater control over when to refresh and which row to refresh. This is done to minimize conflicts with memory accesses, since such a system has both knowledge of the memory access patterns and the refresh requirements of the DRAM. When the row address is supplied by a counter within the DRAM, the system relinquishes control over which row is refreshed and only provides the refresh command. Some modern DRAMs are capable of self-refresh; no external logic is required to instruct the DRAM to refresh or to provide a row address.

Under some conditions, most of the data in DRAM can be recovered even if the DRAM has not been refreshed for several minutes.

=== Memory timing ===
Many parameters are required to fully describe the timing of DRAM operation. Here are some examples for two timing grades of asynchronous DRAM, from a data sheet published in 1998:

Asynchronous DRAM typical timing
	"50 ns"	"60 ns"	Description
t_{RC}	84 ns	104 ns	Random read or write cycle time (from one full /RAS cycle to another)
t_{RAC}	50 ns	60 ns	Access time: /RAS low to valid data out
t_{RCD}	11 ns	14 ns	/RAS low to /CAS low time
t_{RAS}	50 ns	60 ns	/RAS pulse width (minimum /RAS low time)
t_{RP}	30 ns	40 ns	/RAS precharge time (minimum /RAS high time)
t_{PC}	20 ns	25 ns	Page-mode read or write cycle time (/CAS to /CAS)
t_{AA}	25 ns	30 ns	Access time: Column address valid to valid data out (includes address setup time before /CAS low)
t_{CAC}	13 ns	15 ns	Access time: /CAS low to valid data out
t_{CAS}	8 ns	10 ns	/CAS low pulse width minimum

Thus, the generally quoted number is the /RAS low to valid data out time. This is the time to open a row, settle the sense amplifiers, and deliver the selected column data to the output. This is also the minimum /RAS low time, which includes the time for the amplified data to be delivered back to recharge the cells. The time to read additional bits from an open page is much less, defined by the /CAS to /CAS cycle time. The quoted number is the clearest way to compare the performance of different DRAM memories, as it sets the slower limit regardless of the row length or page size. Bigger arrays forcibly result in larger bit line capacitance and longer propagation delays, which cause this time to increase as the sense amplifier settling time is dependent on both the capacitance as well as the propagation latency. This is countered in modern DRAM chips by instead integrating many more complete DRAM arrays within a single chip, to accommodate more capacity without becoming too slow.

When such a RAM is accessed by clocked logic, the times are generally rounded up to the nearest clock cycle. For example, when accessed by a 100 MHz state machine (i.e. a 10 ns clock), the 50 ns DRAM can perform the first read in five clock cycles, and additional reads within the same page every two clock cycles. This was generally described as "5-2-2-2" timing, as bursts of four reads within a page were common.

When describing synchronous memory, timing is described by clock cycle counts separated by hyphens. These numbers represent t_{CL}-t_{RCD}-t_{RP}-t_{RAS} in multiples of the DRAM clock cycle time. Note that this is half of the data transfer rate when double data rate signaling is used. JEDEC standard PC3200 timing is 3-4-4-8 with a 200 MHz clock, while premium-priced high performance PC3200 DDR DRAM DIMM might be operated at 2-2-2-5 timing.

Synchronous DRAM typical timing
		PC-3200 (DDR-400)		PC2-6400 (DDR2-800)		PC3-12800 (DDR3-1600)		Description
		cycles	time	cycles	time	cycles	time	Description
t_{CL}	Typical	3	15 ns	5	12.5 ns	9	11.25 ns	/CAS low to valid data out (equivalent to t_{CAC})
t_{CL}	Fast	2	10 ns	4	10 ns	8	10 ns	/CAS low to valid data out (equivalent to t_{CAC})
t_{RCD}	Typical	4	20 ns	5	12.5 ns	9	11.25 ns	/RAS low to /CAS low time
t_{RCD}	Fast	2	10 ns	4	10 ns	8	10 ns	/RAS low to /CAS low time
t_{RP}	Typical	4	20 ns	5	12.5 ns	9	11.25 ns	/RAS precharge time (minimum precharge to active time)
t_{RP}	Fast	2	10 ns	4	10 ns	8	10 ns	/RAS precharge time (minimum precharge to active time)
t_{RAS}	Typical	8	40 ns	16	40 ns	27	33.75 ns	Row active time (minimum active to precharge time)
t_{RAS}	Fast	5	25 ns	12	30 ns	24	30 ns	Row active time (minimum active to precharge time)

Minimum random access time has improved from t_{RAC} = 50 ns to t_{RCD} + t_{CL} = 22.5 ns, and even the premium 20 ns variety is only 2.5 times faster than the asynchronous DRAM. CAS latency has improved even less, from t_{CAC} = 13 ns to 10 ns. However, the DDR3 memory does achieve 32 times higher bandwidth; due to internal pipelining and wide data paths, it can output two words every 1.25 ns (1600 Mword/s), while the EDO DRAM can output one word per t_{PC} = 20 ns (50 Mword/s).

==== Timing abbreviations ====
- t_{CL} – CAS latency
- t_{CR} – Command rate
- t_{PTP} – precharge to precharge delay
- t_{RAS} – RAS active time
- t_{RCD} – RAS to CAS delay
- t_{REF} – Refresh period
- t_{RFC} – Row refresh cycle time
- t_{RP} – RAS precharge
- t_{RRD} – RAS to RAS delay
- t_{RTP} – Read to precharge delay
- t_{RTR} – Read to read delay
- t_{RTW} – Read to write delay
- t_{WR} – Write recovery time
- t_{WTP} – Write to precharge delay
- t_{WTR} – Write to read delay
- t_{WTW} – Write to write delay

== Memory cell design ==
Each bit of data in a DRAM is stored as a positive or negative electrical charge in a capacitive structure. The structure providing the capacitance, as well as the transistors that control access to it, is collectively referred to as a DRAM cell. They are the fundamental building block in DRAM arrays. Multiple DRAM memory cell variants exist, but the most commonly used variant in modern DRAMs is the one-transistor, one-capacitor (1T1C) cell. The transistor is used to admit current into the capacitor during writes, and to discharge the capacitor during reads. The access transistor is designed to maximize drive strength and minimize transistor-transistor leakage (Kenner, p. 34).

The capacitor has two terminals, one of which is connected to its access transistor, and the other to either ground or V_{CC}/2. In modern DRAMs, the latter case is more common, since it allows faster operation. In modern DRAMs, a voltage of +V_{CC}/2 across the capacitor is required to store a logic one; and a voltage of −V_{CC}/2 across the capacitor is required to store a logic zero. The resultant charge is $Q = \pm {V_{CC} \over 2} \cdot C$, where Q is the charge in coulombs and C is the capacitance in farads.

Reading or writing a logic one requires the wordline be driven to a voltage greater than the sum of V_{CC} and the access transistor's threshold voltage (V_{TH}). This voltage is called V_{CC} pumped (V_{CCP}). The time required to discharge a capacitor thus depends on what logic value is stored in the capacitor. A capacitor containing logic one begins to discharge when the voltage at the access transistor's gate terminal is above V_{CCP}. If the capacitor contains a logic zero, it begins to discharge when the gate terminal voltage is above V_{TH}.

=== Capacitor design ===
Up until the mid-1980s, the capacitors in DRAM cells were co-planar with the access transistor (they were constructed on the surface of the substrate), thus they were referred to as planar capacitors. The drive to increase both density and, to a lesser extent, performance, required denser designs. This was strongly motivated by economics, a major consideration for DRAM devices, especially commodity DRAMs. The minimization of DRAM cell area can produce a denser device and lower the cost per bit of storage. Starting in the mid-1980s, the capacitor was moved above or below the silicon substrate in order to meet these objectives. DRAM cells featuring capacitors above the substrate are referred to as stacked or folded plate capacitors. Those with capacitors buried beneath the substrate surface are referred to as trench capacitors. In the 2000s, manufacturers were sharply divided by the type of capacitor used in their DRAMs and the relative cost and long-term scalability of both designs have been the subject of extensive debate. The majority of DRAMs, from major manufacturers such as Hynix, Micron Technology, Samsung Electronics use the stacked capacitor structure, whereas smaller manufacturers such as Nanya Technology use the trench capacitor structure (Jacob, pp. 355–357).

The capacitor in the stacked capacitor scheme is constructed above the surface of the substrate. The capacitor is constructed from an oxide-nitride-oxide (ONO) dielectric sandwiched in between two layers of polysilicon plates (the top plate is shared by all DRAM cells in an IC), and its shape can be a rectangle, a cylinder, or some other more complex shape. There are two basic variations of the stacked capacitor, based on its location relative to the bitline—capacitor-under-bitline (CUB) and capacitor-over-bitline (COB). In the former, the capacitor is underneath the bitline, which is usually made of metal, and the bitline has a polysilicon contact that extends downwards to connect it to the access transistor's source terminal. In the latter, the capacitor is constructed above the bitline, which is almost always made of polysilicon, but is otherwise identical to the COB variation. The advantage the COB variant possesses is the ease of fabricating the contact between the bitline and the access transistor's source, as it is physically close to the substrate surface. However, this requires the active area to be laid out at a 45-degree angle when viewed from above, which makes it difficult to ensure that the capacitor contact does not touch the bitline. CUB cells avoid this, but suffer from difficulties in inserting contacts in between bitlines, since the size of features this close to the surface are at or near the minimum feature size of the process technology (Kenner, pp. 33–42).

The trench capacitor is constructed by etching a deep hole into the silicon substrate. The substrate volume surrounding the hole is then heavily doped to produce a buried n^{+} plate with low resistance. A layer of oxide-nitride-oxide dielectric is grown or deposited, and finally the hole is filled by depositing doped polysilicon, which forms the top plate of the capacitor. The top of the capacitor is connected to the access transistor's drain terminal via a polysilicon strap (Kenner, pp. 42–44). A trench capacitor's depth-to-width ratio in DRAMs of the mid-2000s can exceed 50:1 (Jacob, p. 357).

Trench capacitors have numerous advantages. Since the capacitor is buried in the bulk of the substrate instead of lying on its surface, the area it occupies can be minimized to what is required to connect it to the access transistor's drain terminal without decreasing the capacitor's size, and thus capacitance (Jacob, pp. 356–357). Alternatively, the capacitance can be increased by etching a deeper hole without any increase to surface area (Kenner, p. 44). Another advantage of the trench capacitor is that its structure is under the layers of metal interconnect, allowing them to be more easily made planar, which enables it to be integrated in a logic-optimized process technology, which has many levels of interconnect above the substrate. The fact that the capacitor is under the logic means that it is constructed before the transistors are. This allows high-temperature processes to fabricate the capacitors, which would otherwise degrade the logic transistors and their performance. This makes trench capacitors suitable for constructing embedded DRAM (eDRAM) (Jacob, p. 357). Disadvantages of trench capacitors are difficulties in reliably constructing the capacitor's structures within deep holes and in connecting the capacitor to the access transistor's drain terminal (Kenner, p. 44).

=== Historical cell designs ===
First-generation DRAM ICs (those with capacities of 1 Kbit), such as the archetypical Intel 1103, used a three-transistor, one-capacitor (3T1C) DRAM cell with separate read and write circuitry. The write wordline drove a write transistor which connected the capacitor to the write bitline just as in the 1T1C cell, but there was a separate read wordline and read transistor which connected an amplifier transistor to the read bitline. By the second generation, the drive to reduce cost by fitting the same amount of bits in a smaller area led to the almost universal adoption of the 1T1C DRAM cell, although a couple of devices with 4 and 16 Kbit capacities continued to use the 3T1C cell for performance reasons (Kenner, p. 6). These performance advantages included, most significantly, the ability to read the state stored by the capacitor without discharging it, avoiding the need to write back what was read out (non-destructive read). A second performance advantage relates to the 3T1C cell's separate transistors for reading and writing; the memory controller can exploit this feature to perform atomic read-modify-writes, where a value is read, modified, and then written back as a single, indivisible operation (Jacob, p. 459).

=== Proposed cell designs ===
The one-transistor, zero-capacitor (1T, or 1T0C) DRAM cell has been a topic of research since the late 1990s. 1T DRAM is a different way of constructing the basic DRAM memory cell, distinct from the classic one-transistor/one-capacitor (1T/1C) DRAM cell, which is also sometimes referred to as 1T DRAM, particularly in comparison to the 3T and 4T DRAM which it replaced in the 1970s.

In 1T DRAM cells, the bit of data is still stored in a capacitive region controlled by a transistor, but this capacitance is no longer provided by a separate capacitor. 1T DRAM is a "capacitorless" bit cell design that stores data using the parasitic body capacitance that is inherent to silicon on insulator (SOI) transistors. Considered a nuisance in logic design, this floating body effect can be used for data storage. This gives 1T DRAM cells the greatest density as well as allowing easier integration with high-performance logic circuits since they are constructed with the same SOI process technologies.

Refreshing of cells remains necessary, but unlike with 1T1C DRAM, reads in 1T DRAM are non-destructive; the stored charge causes a detectable shift in the threshold voltage of the transistor. Performance-wise, access times are significantly better than capacitor-based DRAMs, but slightly worse than SRAM. There are several types of 1T DRAMs: the commercialized Z-RAM from Innovative Silicon, the TTRAM from Renesas and the A-RAM from the UGR/CNRS consortium.

== Array structures ==
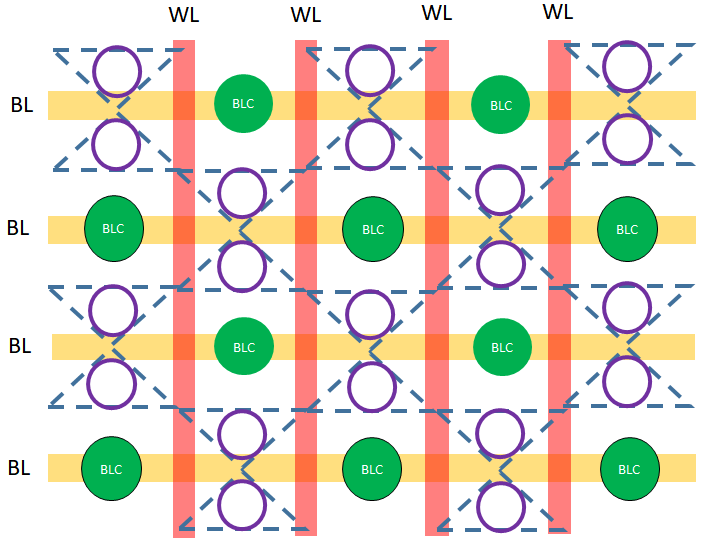
Self-aligned storage node locations simplify the fabrication process in modern DRAM.

DRAM cells are laid out in a regular rectangular, grid-like pattern to facilitate their control and access via wordlines and bitlines. The physical layout of the DRAM cells in an array is typically designed so that two adjacent DRAM cells in a column share a single bitline contact to reduce their area. DRAM cell area is given as nF^{2}, where n is a number derived from the DRAM cell design, and F is the smallest feature size of a given process technology. This scheme permits comparison of DRAM size over different process technology generations, as DRAM cell area scales at linear or near-linear rates with respect to feature size. The typical area for modern DRAM cells varies between 6–8 F^{2}.

The horizontal wire, the wordline, is connected to the gate terminal of every access transistor in its row. The vertical bitline is connected to the source terminal of the transistors in its column. The lengths of the wordlines and bitlines are limited. The wordline length is limited by the desired performance of the array, since the propagation time of the signal that must traverse the wordline is determined by the RC time constant. The bitline length is limited by its capacitance (which increases with length), which must be kept within a range for proper sensing (as DRAMs operate by sensing the charge of the capacitor released onto the bitline). Bitline length is also limited by the amount of operating current the DRAM can draw and by how power can be dissipated, since these two characteristics are largely determined by the charging and discharging of the bitline.

=== Bitline architecture ===
Sense amplifiers are required to read the state contained in the DRAM cells. When the access transistor is activated, the electrical charge in the capacitor is shared with the bitline. The bitline's capacitance is much greater than that of the capacitor (approximately ten times). Thus, the change in bitline voltage is minute. Sense amplifiers are required to resolve the voltage differential into the levels specified by the logic signaling system. Modern DRAMs use differential sense amplifiers and are accompanied by requirements as to how the DRAM arrays are constructed. Differential sense amplifiers work by driving their outputs to opposing extremes based on the relative voltages on pairs of bitlines. The sense amplifiers function effectively and efficiently only if the capacitance and voltages of these bitline pairs are closely matched. Besides ensuring that the lengths of the bitlines and the number of DRAM cells attached to them are equal, two basic architectures to array design have emerged to provide for the requirements of the sense amplifiers: open and folded bitline arrays.

==== Open bitline arrays ====
The first generation (1 Kbit) DRAM ICs, up until the 64 Kbit generation (and some 256 Kbit generation devices) had open bitline array architectures. In these architectures, the bitlines are divided into multiple segments, and the differential sense amplifiers are placed in between bitline segments. Because the sense amplifiers are placed between bitline segments, to route their outputs outside the array, an additional layer of interconnect placed above those used to construct the wordlines and bitlines is required.

The DRAM cells that are on the edges of the array do not have adjacent segments. Since the differential sense amplifiers require identical capacitance and bitline lengths from both segments, dummy bitline segments are provided. The advantage of the open bitline array is a smaller array area, although this advantage is slightly diminished by the dummy bitline segments. The disadvantage that caused the near disappearance of this architecture is the inherent vulnerability to noise, which affects the effectiveness of the differential sense amplifiers. Since each bitline segment does not have any spatial relationship to the other, it is likely that noise would affect only one of the two bitline segments.

==== Folded bitline arrays ====
The folded bitline array architecture routes bitlines in pairs throughout the array. The close proximity of the paired bitlines provides superior common-mode noise rejection characteristics over open bitline arrays. The folded bitline array architecture began appearing in DRAM ICs during the mid-1980s, beginning with the 256 Kbit generation. This architecture is favored in modern DRAM ICs for its superior noise immunity.

This architecture is referred to as folded because it takes its basis from the open array architecture from the perspective of the circuit schematic. The folded array architecture appears to remove DRAM cells in alternate pairs (because two DRAM cells share a single bitline contact) from a column, then move the DRAM cells from an adjacent column into the voids.

The location where the bitline twists occupies additional area. To minimize area overhead, engineers select the simplest and most area-minimal twisting scheme that is able to reduce noise under the specified limit. As process technology improves to reduce minimum feature sizes, the signal-to-noise problem worsens, since coupling between adjacent metal wires is inversely proportional to their pitch. The array folding and bitline twisting schemes that are used must increase in complexity in order to maintain sufficient noise reduction. Schemes that have desirable noise immunity characteristics for a minimal impact in area is the topic of current research (Kenner, p. 37).

==== Future array architectures ====
Advances in process technology could result in open bitline array architectures being favored if it is able to offer better long-term area efficiencies, since folded array architectures require increasingly complex folding schemes to match any advance in process technology. The relationship between process technology, array architecture, and area efficiency is an active area of research.

=== Row and column redundancy ===
The first DRAM integrated circuits did not have any redundancy. An integrated circuit with a defective DRAM cell would be discarded. Beginning with the 64 Kbit generation, DRAM arrays have included spare rows and columns to improve yields. Spare rows and columns provide tolerance of minor fabrication defects which have caused a small number of rows or columns to be inoperable. The defective rows and columns are physically disconnected from the rest of the array by triggering a programmable fuse or by cutting the wire with a laser. The spare rows or columns are substituted in by remapping logic in the row and column decoders (Jacob, pp. 358–361).

== Error detection and correction ==
Electrical or magnetic interference inside a computer system can cause a single bit of DRAM to spontaneously flip to the opposite state. The majority of one-off ("soft") errors in DRAM chips occur as a result of background radiation, chiefly neutrons from cosmic ray secondaries, which may change the contents of one or more memory cells or interfere with the circuitry used to read/write them.

The problem can be mitigated by using redundant memory bits and additional circuitry that use these bits to detect and correct soft errors. In most cases, the detection and correction are performed by the memory controller; sometimes, the required logic is transparently implemented within DRAM chips or modules, enabling the ECC memory functionality for otherwise ECC-incapable systems. The extra memory bits are used to record parity and to enable missing data to be reconstructed by error-correcting code (ECC). Parity allows the detection of all single-bit errors (actually, any odd number of wrong bits). The most common error-correcting code, a SECDED Hamming code, allows a single-bit error to be corrected and, in the usual configuration, with an extra parity bit, double-bit errors to be detected.

Recent studies give widely varying error rates with over seven orders of magnitude difference, ranging from 10^{−10}−10^{−17} error/bit·h, roughly one bit error, per hour, per gigabyte of memory to one bit error, per century, per gigabyte of memory. The Schroeder et al. 2009 study reported a 32% chance that a given computer in their study would suffer from at least one correctable error per year, and provided evidence that most such errors are intermittent hard rather than soft errors and that trace amounts of radioactive material that had gotten into the chip packaging were emitting alpha particles and corrupting the data. A 2010 study at the University of Rochester also gave evidence that a substantial fraction of memory errors are intermittent hard errors. Large scale studies on non-ECC main memory in PCs and laptops suggest that undetected memory errors account for a substantial number of system failures: the 2011 study reported a 1-in-1700 chance per 1.5% of memory tested (extrapolating to an approximately 26% chance for total memory) that a computer would have a memory error every eight months.

== Security ==
=== Data remanence ===
Although dynamic memory is only specified and guaranteed to retain its contents when supplied with power and refreshed every short period of time (often 64 ms), the memory cell capacitors often retain their values for significantly longer time, particularly at low temperatures. Under some conditions most of the data in DRAM can be recovered even if it has not been refreshed for several minutes.

This property can be used to circumvent security and recover data stored in the main memory that is assumed to be destroyed at power-down. The computer could be quickly rebooted, and the contents of the main memory read out; or by removing a computer's memory modules, cooling them to prolong data remanence, then transferring them to a different computer to be read out. Such an attack was demonstrated to circumvent popular disk encryption systems, such as the open source TrueCrypt, Microsoft's BitLocker Drive Encryption, and Apple's FileVault. This type of attack against a computer is often called a cold boot attack.

=== Memory corruption ===
Dynamic memory, by definition, requires periodic refresh. Furthermore, reading dynamic memory is a destructive operation, requiring a recharge of the storage cells in the row that has been read. If these processes are imperfect, a read operation can cause soft errors. In particular, there is a risk that some charge can leak between nearby cells, causing the refresh or read of one row to cause a disturbance error in an adjacent or even nearby row. The awareness of disturbance errors dates back to the first commercially available DRAM in the early 1970s (the Intel 1103). Despite the mitigation techniques employed by manufacturers, commercial researchers proved in a 2014 analysis that commercially available DDR3 DRAM chips manufactured in 2012 and 2013 are susceptible to disturbance errors. The associated side effect that led to observed bit flips has been dubbed row hammer.

== Packaging ==
=== Memory module ===
Dynamic RAM ICs can be packaged in molded epoxy cases, with an internal lead frame for interconnections between the silicon die and the package leads. The original IBM PC design used ICs, including those for DRAM, packaged in dual in-line packages (DIP), soldered directly to the main board or mounted in sockets. As memory density skyrocketed, the DIP package was no longer practical. For convenience in handling, several dynamic RAM integrated circuits may be mounted on a single memory module, allowing installation of 16-bit, 32-bit or 64-bit wide memory in a single unit, without the requirement for the installer to insert multiple individual integrated circuits. Memory modules may include additional devices for parity checking or error correction. Over the evolution of desktop computers, several standardized types of memory module have been developed. Laptop computers, game consoles, and specialized devices may have their own formats of memory modules not interchangeable with standard desktop parts for packaging or proprietary reasons.

=== Embedded ===
DRAM that is integrated into an integrated circuit designed in a logic-optimized process (such as an application-specific integrated circuit, microprocessor, or an entire system on a chip) is called embedded DRAM (eDRAM). Embedded DRAM requires DRAM cell designs that can be fabricated without preventing the fabrication of fast-switching transistors used in high-performance logic, and modification of the basic logic-optimized process technology to accommodate the process steps required to build DRAM cell structures.

== Types ==
Since the fundamental DRAM cell and array has maintained the same basic structure for many years, the types of DRAM are mainly distinguished by the many different interfaces for communicating with DRAM chips.

=== Asynchronous DRAM ===
The original DRAM, now known by the retronym asynchronous DRAM was the first type of DRAM in use. From its origins in the late 1960s, it was commonplace in computing up until around 1997, when it was mostly replaced by synchronous DRAM. In the present day, manufacture of asynchronous RAM is relatively rare.

==== Principles of operation ====
An asynchronous DRAM chip has power connections, some number of address inputs (typically 12), and a few (typically one or four) bidirectional data lines. There are three main active-low control signals:

- R̅A̅S̅, the Row Address Strobe. The address inputs are captured on the falling edge of R̅A̅S̅, and select a row to open. The row is held open as long as R̅A̅S̅ is low.
- C̅A̅S̅, the Column Address Strobe. The address inputs are captured on the falling edge of C̅A̅S̅, and select a column from the currently open row to read or write.
- W̅E̅, Write Enable. This signal determines whether a given falling edge of C̅A̅S̅ is a read (if high) or write (if low). If low, the data inputs are also captured on the falling edge of C̅A̅S̅. If high, the data outputs are enabled by the falling edge of C̅A̅S̅ and produce valid output after the internal access time.

This interface provides direct control of internal timing: when R̅A̅S̅ is driven low, a C̅A̅S̅ cycle must not be attempted until the sense amplifiers have sensed the memory state, and R̅A̅S̅ must not be returned high until the storage cells have been refreshed. When R̅A̅S̅ is driven high, it must be held high long enough for precharging to complete.

Although the DRAM is asynchronous, the signals are typically generated by a clocked memory controller, which limits their timing to multiples of the controller's clock cycle.

For completeness, we mention two other control signals which are not essential to DRAM operation, but are provided for the convenience of systems using DRAM:

- C̅S̅, Chip Select. When this is high, all other inputs are ignored. This makes it easy to build an array of DRAM chips which share the same control signals. Just as DRAM internally uses the word lines to select one row of storage cells to connect to the shared bit lines and sense amplifiers, C̅S̅ is used to select one row of DRAM chips to connect to the shared control, address, and data lines.
- O̅E̅, Output Enable. This is an additional signal that (if high) inhibits output on the data I/‍O pins, while allowing all other operations to proceed normally. In many applications, O̅E̅ can be permanently connected low (output enabled whenever C̅S̅, R̅A̅S̅ and C̅A̅S̅ are low and W̅E̅ is high), but in high-speed applications, judicious use of O̅E̅ can prevent bus contention between two DRAM chips connected to the same data lines. For example, it is possible to have two interleaved memory banks sharing the address and data lines, but each having their own R̅A̅S̅, C̅A̅S̅, W̅E̅ and O̅E̅ connections. The memory controller can begin a read from the second bank while a read from the first bank is in progress, using the two O̅E̅ signals to only permit one result to appear on the data bus at a time.

===== RAS-only refresh =====
Classic asynchronous DRAM is refreshed by opening each row in turn.

The refresh cycles are distributed across the entire refresh interval in such a way that all rows are refreshed within the required interval. To refresh one row of the memory array using R̅A̅S̅ only refresh (ROR), the following steps must occur:

1. The row address of the row to be refreshed must be applied at the address input pins.
2. R̅A̅S̅ must switch from high to low. C̅A̅S̅ must remain high.
3. At the end of the required amount of time, R̅A̅S̅ must return high.

This can be done by supplying a row address and pulsing R̅A̅S̅ low; it is not necessary to perform any C̅A̅S̅ cycles. An external counter is needed to iterate over the row addresses in turn. In some designs, the CPU handled RAM refresh. The Zilog Z80 is perhaps the best-known example, as it has an internal row counter R which supplies the address for a special refresh cycle generated after each instruction fetch. In other systems, especially home computers, refresh was handled by the video circuitry as a side effect of its periodic scan of the frame buffer.

===== CAS before RAS refresh =====
For convenience, the counter was quickly incorporated into the DRAM chips themselves. If the C̅A̅S̅ line is driven low before R̅A̅S̅ (normally an illegal operation), then the DRAM ignores the address inputs and uses an internal counter to select the row to open. This is known as C̅A̅S̅-before-R̅A̅S̅ (CBR) refresh. This became the standard form of refresh for asynchronous DRAM, and is the only form generally used with SDRAM.

===== Hidden refresh =====
Given support of C̅A̅S̅-before-R̅A̅S̅ refresh, it is possible to deassert R̅A̅S̅ while holding C̅A̅S̅ low to maintain data output. If R̅A̅S̅ is then asserted again, this performs a CBR refresh cycle while the DRAM outputs remain valid. Because data output is not interrupted, this is known as hidden refresh. Hidden refresh is no faster than a normal read followed by a normal refresh, but does maintain the data output valid during the refresh cycle.

==== Page mode DRAM ====
Page mode DRAM is a minor modification to the first-generation DRAM IC interface which improves the performance of reads and writes to a row by avoiding the inefficiency of precharging and opening the same row repeatedly to access a different column. In page mode DRAM, after a row is opened by holding R̅A̅S̅ low, the row can be kept open, and multiple reads or writes can be performed to any of the columns in the row. Each column access is initiated by presenting a column address and asserting C̅A̅S̅. For reads, after a delay (t_{CAC}), valid data appears on the data out pins, which are held at high-Z before the appearance of valid data. For writes, the write enable signal and write data is presented along with the column address.

Page mode DRAM was in turn later improved with a small modification which further reduced latency. DRAMs with this improvement are called fast page mode DRAMs (FPM DRAMs). In page mode DRAM, the chip does not capture the column address until C̅A̅S̅ is asserted, so column access time (until data out was valid) begins when C̅A̅S̅ is asserted. In FPM DRAM, the column address can be supplied while C̅A̅S̅ is still deasserted, and the main column access time (t_{AA}) begins as soon as the address is stable. The C̅A̅S̅ signal is only needed to enable the output (the data out pins were held at high-Z while C̅A̅S̅ was deasserted), so time from C̅A̅S̅ assertion to data valid (t_{CAC}) is greatly reduced. Fast page mode DRAM was introduced in 1986 and was used with the Intel 80486.

Static column is a variant of fast page mode in which the column address does not need to be latched, but rather the address inputs may be changed with C̅A̅S̅ held low, and the data output will be updated a few nanoseconds later accordingly.

Nibble mode is another variant in which four sequential locations within the row can be accessed with four consecutive pulses of C̅A̅S̅. The difference from normal page mode is that the address inputs are not used for the second through fourth C̅A̅S̅ edges but are generated internally starting with the address supplied for the first C̅A̅S̅ edge. The predictable addresses let the chip prepare the data internally and respond very quickly to the subsequent C̅A̅S̅ pulses.

==== Extended data out DRAM ====
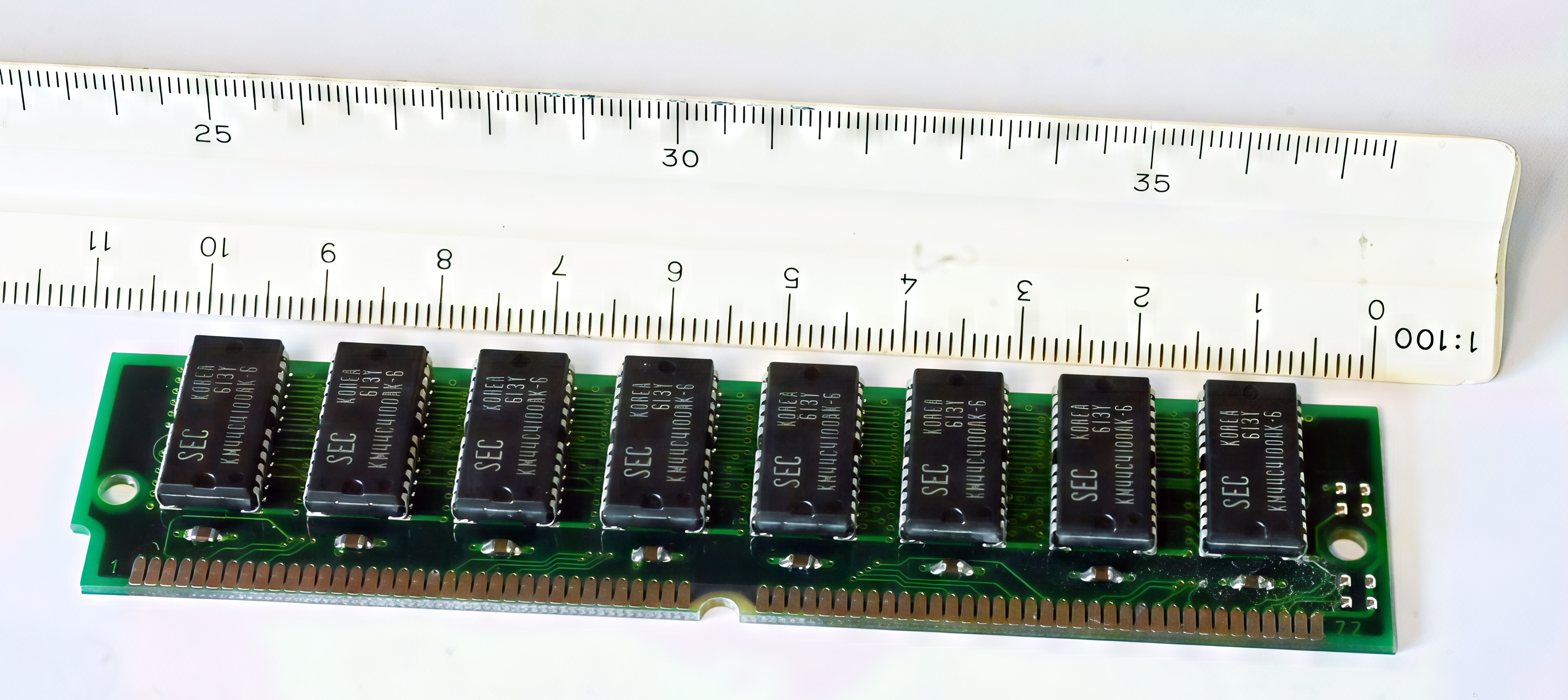
A 16 MB EDO DRAM module made by Samsung Electronics

Extended data out DRAM (EDO DRAM) was invented and patented in the 1990s by Micron Technology, which then licensed technology to many other memory manufacturers. EDO RAM, sometimes referred to as hyper page mode enabled DRAM, is similar to fast page mode DRAM with the additional feature that a new access cycle can be started while keeping the data output of the previous cycle active. This can be used to overlap operations a certain amount (pipelining) and improve performance somewhat. It is up to 30% faster than FPM DRAM which it began to replace in 1995 when Intel introduced the 430FX chipset with EDO DRAM support. Regardless of the performance gains, FPM and EDO SIMMs can be used interchangeably in many (but not all) applications.

To be precise, EDO DRAM begins data output on the falling edge of C̅A̅S̅ but does not disable the output when C̅A̅S̅ rises again. Instead, it holds the current output valid (thus extending the data output time) even as the DRAM begins decoding a new column address, until either a new column's data is selected by another C̅A̅S̅ falling edge, or the output is switched off by the rising edge of R̅A̅S̅. (Or, less commonly, a change in C̅S̅, O̅E̅, or W̅E̅.)

This ability to start a new access even before the system has received the preceding column's data made it possible to design memory controllers which could carry out a C̅A̅S̅ access (in the currently open row) in one clock cycle, or at least within two clock cycles instead of the previously required three. EDO's capabilities were able to partially compensate for the performance lost due to the lack of an L2 cache in low-cost, commodity PCs. More expensive notebooks also often lacked an L2 cache due to size and power limitations, and benefited similarly. Even for systems with an L2 cache, the availability of EDO memory improved the average memory latency seen by applications over earlier FPM implementations.

Single-cycle EDO DRAM became very popular on video cards toward the end of the 1990s. It was very low cost, yet nearly as efficient for performance as the far more costly VRAM.

==== Burst EDO DRAM ====
An evolution of EDO DRAM, burst EDO DRAM (BEDO DRAM), could process four memory addresses in one burst, for a maximum of 5-1-1-1, saving an additional three clocks over optimally designed EDO memory. It was done by adding an address counter on the chip to keep track of the next address. BEDO also added a pipeline stage, allowing the page-access cycle to be divided into two parts. During a memory-read operation, the first part accessed the data from the memory array to the output stage (second latch). The second part drove the data bus from this latch at the appropriate logic level. Since the data is already in the output buffer, quicker access time is achieved (up to 50% for large blocks of data) than with traditional EDO.

Although BEDO DRAM showed additional optimization over EDO, by the time it was available the market had made a significant investment towards synchronous DRAM, or SDRAM. Even though BEDO RAM was superior to SDRAM in some ways, the latter technology quickly displaced BEDO.

=== Synchronous dynamic RAM ===
Synchronous dynamic RAM (SDRAM) significantly revises the asynchronous memory interface, adding a clock (and a clock enable) line. All other signals are received on the rising edge of the clock.

The R̅A̅S̅ and C̅A̅S̅ inputs no longer act as strobes, but are instead, along with W̅E̅, part of a 3-bit command:

SDRAM Command summary
C̅S̅	R̅A̅S̅	C̅A̅S̅	W̅E̅	Address	Command
H	x	x	x	x	Command inhibit (no operation)
L	H	H	H	x	No operation
L	H	H	L	x	Burst Terminate: stop a read or write burst in progress.
L	H	L	H	Column	Read from currently active row.
L	H	L	L	Column	Write to currently active row.
L	L	H	H	Row	Activate a row for read and write.
L	L	H	L	x	Precharge (deactivate) the current row.
L	L	L	H	x	Auto refresh: refresh one row of each bank, using an internal counter.
L	L	L	L	Mode	Load mode register: address bus specifies DRAM operation mode.

The O̅E̅ line's function is extended to a per-byte DQM signal, which controls data input (writes) in addition to data output (reads). This allows DRAM chips to be wider than 8 bits while still supporting byte-granularity writes.

Many timing parameters remain under the control of the DRAM controller. For example, a minimum time must elapse between a row being activated and a read or write command. One important parameter must be programmed into the SDRAM chip itself, namely the CAS latency. This is the number of clock cycles allowed for internal operations between a read command and the first data word appearing on the data bus. The Load mode register command is used to transfer this value to the SDRAM chip. Other configurable parameters include the length of read and write bursts, i.e., the number of words transferred per read or write command.

The most significant change, and the primary reason that SDRAM has supplanted asynchronous RAM, is the support for multiple internal banks inside the DRAM chip. Using a few bits of bank address that accompany each command, a second bank can be activated and begin reading data while a read from the first bank is in progress. By alternating banks, a single SDRAM device can keep the data bus continuously busy, in a way that asynchronous DRAM cannot.

==== Single data rate synchronous DRAM ====
Single data rate SDRAM (SDR SDRAM or SDR) is the original generation of SDRAM; it made a single transfer of data per clock cycle.

==== Double data rate synchronous DRAM ====
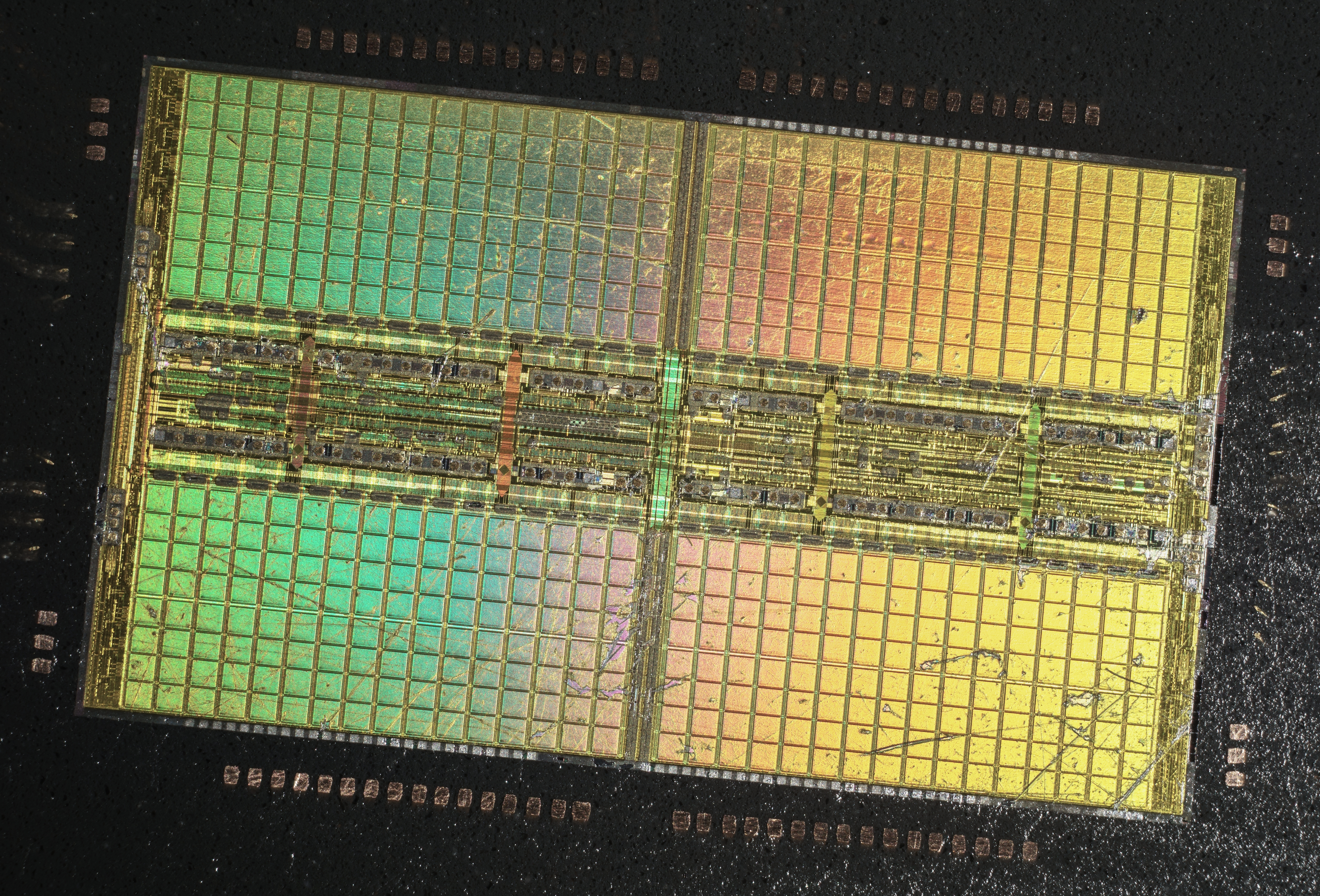
The die of a Samsung DDR-SDRAM 64-MBit package

Double data rate SDRAM (DDR SDRAM or DDR) was a later development of SDRAM, used in PC memory beginning in 2000. Subsequent specifications are numbered sequentially (DDR2, DDR3, etc.). DDR SDRAM internally performs double-width accesses at the clock rate, and uses a double data rate interface to transfer one half on each clock edge. DDR2 and DDR3 increased this factor to 4× and 8×, respectively, delivering 4-word and 8-word bursts over 2 and 4 clock cycles, respectively. The internal access rate is mostly unchanged (200 million per second for DDR-400, DDR2-800 and DDR3-1600 memory), but each access transfers more data.

==== Direct Rambus DRAM ====
Direct RAMBUS DRAM (DRDRAM) was developed by Rambus. First supported on motherboards in 1999, it was intended to become an industry standard, but was outcompeted by DDR SDRAM, making it technically obsolete by 2003.

==== Reduced Latency DRAM ====
Reduced Latency DRAM (RLDRAM) is a high-performance double data rate (DDR) SDRAM that combines fast, random access with high bandwidth, mainly intended for networking and caching applications.

=== Graphics RAM ===
Graphics RAMs are asynchronous and synchronous DRAMs designed for graphics-related tasks such as texture memory and framebuffers, found on video cards.

==== Video DRAM ====
Video DRAM (VRAM) is a dual-ported variant of DRAM that was once commonly used to store the frame buffer in some graphics adapters.

==== Window DRAM ====
Window DRAM (WRAM) is a variant of VRAM that was once used in graphics adapters such as the Matrox Millennium and ATI 3D Rage Pro. WRAM was designed to perform better and cost less than VRAM. WRAM offered up to 25% greater bandwidth than VRAM and accelerated commonly used graphical operations such as text drawing and block fills.

==== Multibank DRAM ====
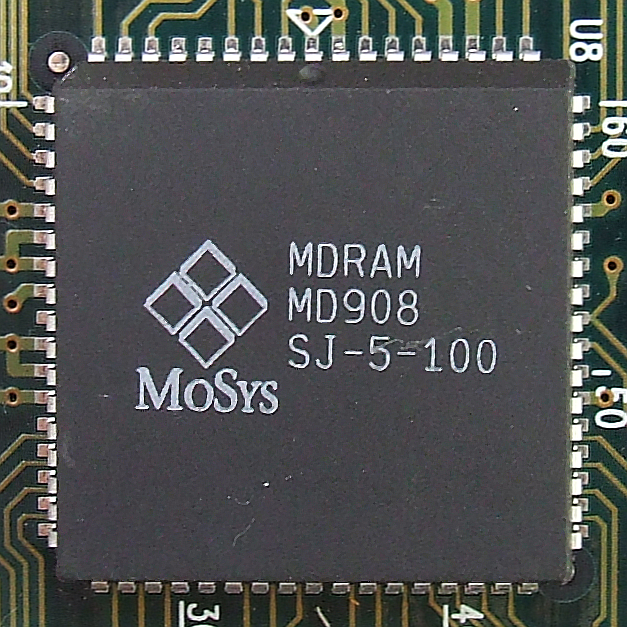
MoSys MDRAM MD908

Multibank DRAM (MDRAM) is a type of specialized DRAM developed by MoSys. It is constructed from small memory banks of 256 kB, which are operated in an interleaved fashion, providing bandwidths suitable for graphics cards at a lower cost to memories such as SRAM. MDRAM also allows operations to two banks in a single clock cycle, permitting multiple concurrent accesses to occur if the accesses were independent. MDRAM was primarily used in graphic cards, such as those featuring the Tseng Labs ET6x00 chipsets. Boards based upon this chipset often had the unusual capacity of 2.25 MB because of MDRAM's ability to be implemented more easily with such capacities. A graphics card with 2.25 MB of MDRAM had enough memory to provide 24-bit color at a resolution of 1024 × 768—a very popular setting at the time.

==== Synchronous graphics RAM ====
Synchronous graphics RAM (SGRAM) is a specialized form of SDRAM for graphics adapters. It adds functions such as bit masking (writing to a specified bit plane without affecting the others) and block write (filling a block of memory with a single color). Unlike VRAM and WRAM, SGRAM is single-ported. However, it can open two memory pages at once, which simulates the dual-port nature of other video RAM technologies.

==== Graphics double data rate SDRAM ====
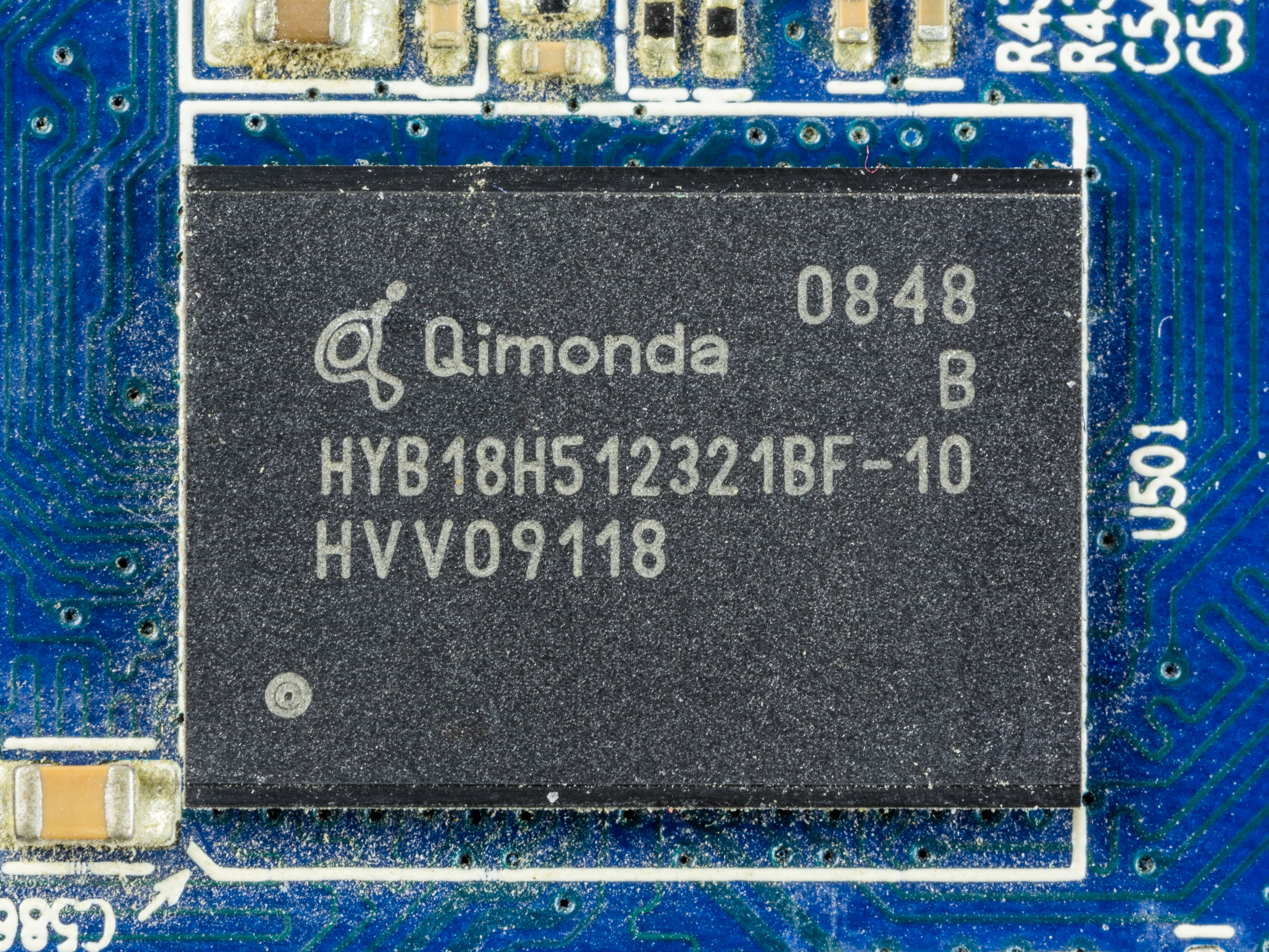
A 512-MBit Qimonda GDDR3 SDRAM package

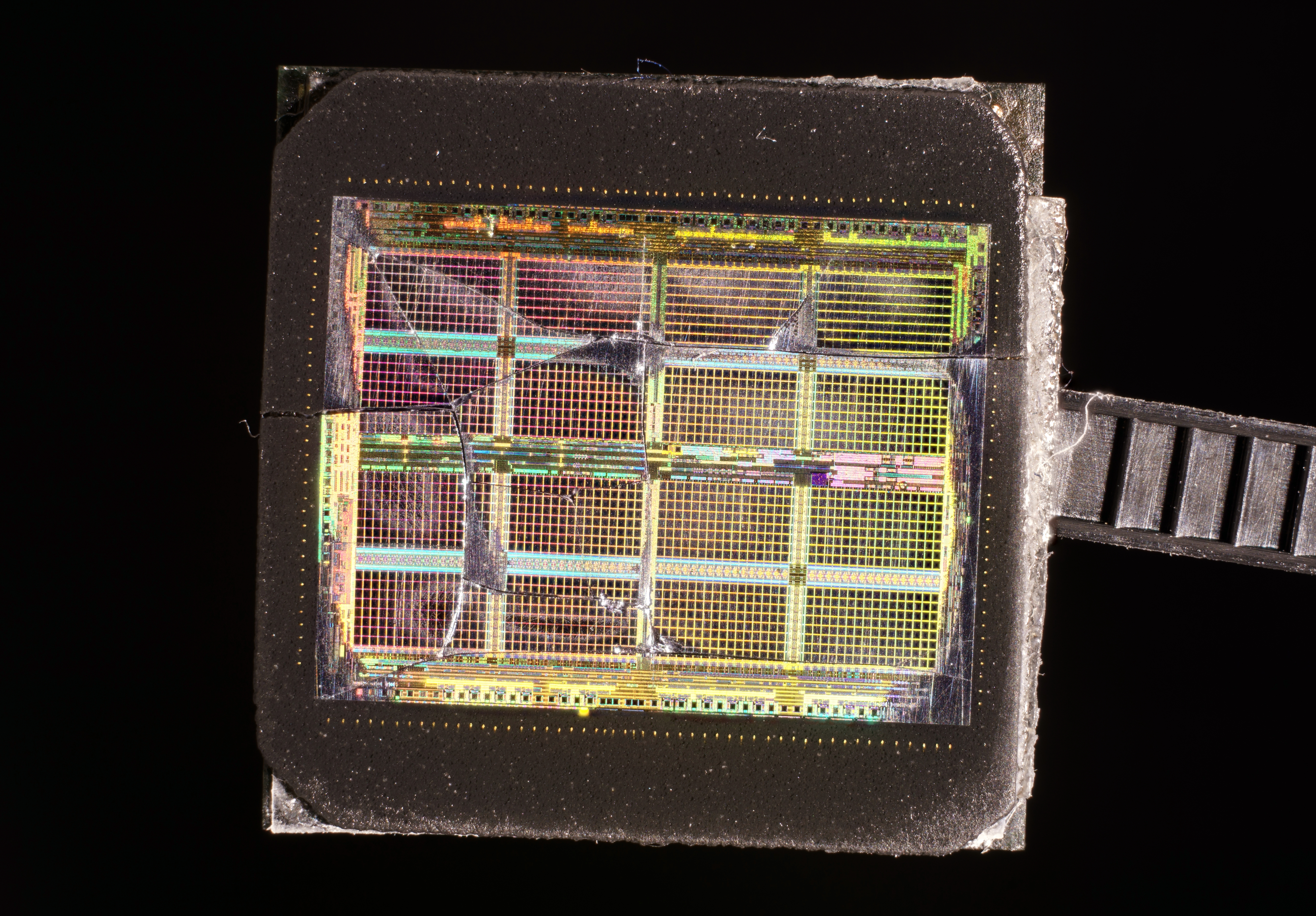
Inside a Samsung GDDR3 256-MBit package

Graphics double data rate SDRAM is a type of specialized DDR SDRAM designed to be used as the main memory of graphics processing units (GPUs). GDDR SDRAM is distinct from commodity types of DDR SDRAM such as DDR3, although they share some core technologies. Their primary characteristics are higher clock frequencies for both the DRAM core and I/O interface, which provides greater memory bandwidth for GPUs. As of 2025, there are eight successive generations of GDDR: GDDR2, GDDR3, GDDR4, GDDR5, GDDR5X, GDDR6, GDDR6X and GDDR7.

=== Pseudostatic RAM ===
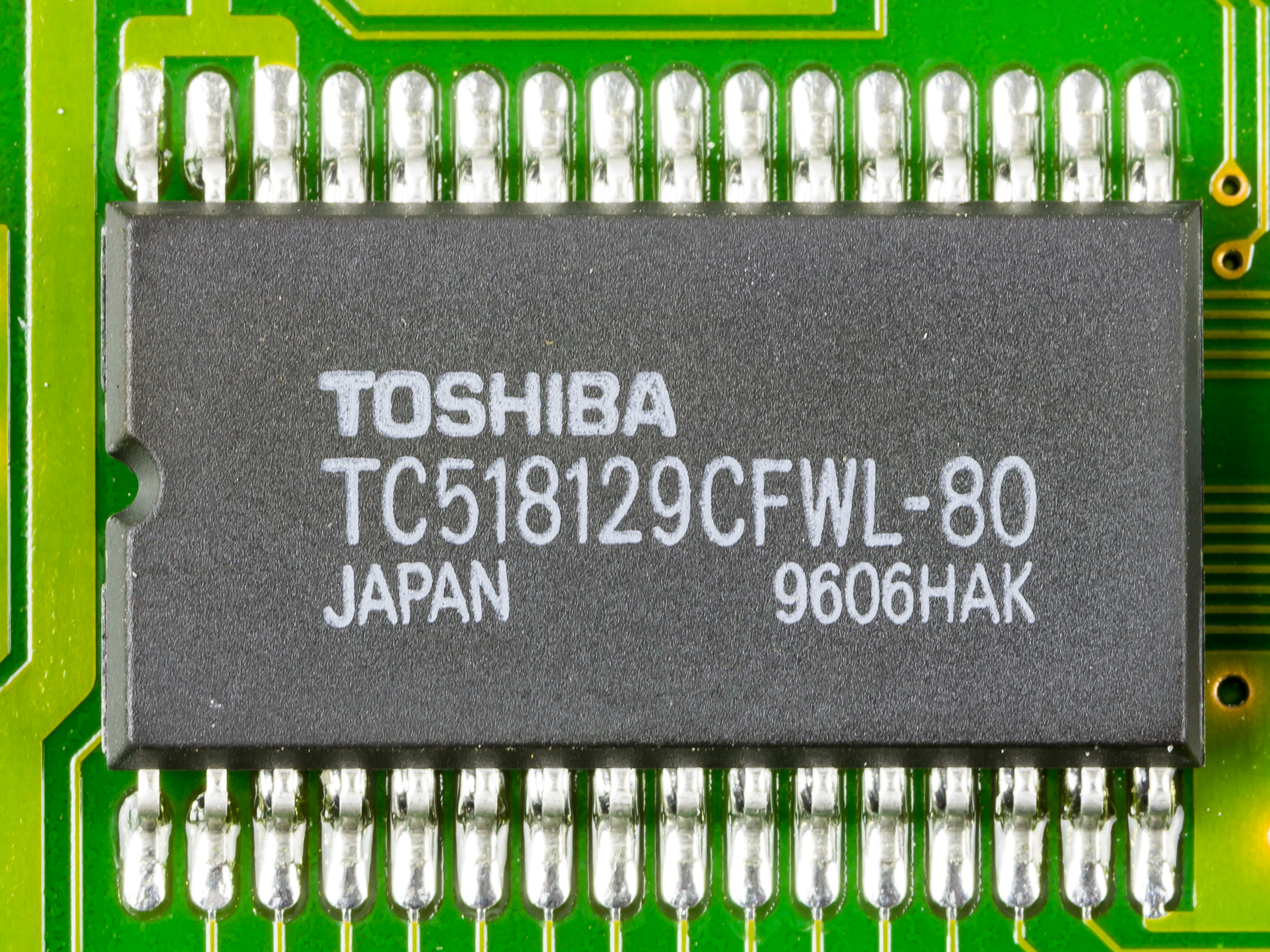
1 Mbit high-speed CMOS pseudostatic RAM, made by Toshiba

Pseudostatic RAM (PSRAM or PSDRAM) is dynamic RAM with built-in refresh and address-control circuitry to make it behave similarly to static RAM (SRAM). It combines the high density of DRAM with the ease of use of true SRAM. PSRAM was used in the Apple iPhone 3G and other embedded systems such as XFlar Platform.

Some DRAM components have a self-refresh mode. While this involves much of the same logic that is needed for pseudo-static operation, this mode is often equivalent to a standby mode. It is provided primarily to allow a system to suspend operation of its DRAM controller to save power without losing data stored in DRAM, rather than to allow operation without a separate DRAM controller as is in the case of mentioned PSRAMs.

An embedded variant of PSRAM was sold by MoSys under the name 1T-SRAM. It is a set of small DRAM banks with an SRAM cache in front to make it behave much like a true SRAM. It is used in Nintendo GameCube and Wii video game consoles.

Cypress Semiconductor's HyperRAM is a type of PSRAM supporting a JEDEC-compliant 8-pin HyperBus or Octal xSPI interface.

== See also ==
- DRAM industry price fixing
- Flash memory
- List of interface bit rates
- Memory bank
- Memory geometry
