= DRAM industry price fixing =

Court cases in US & Europe

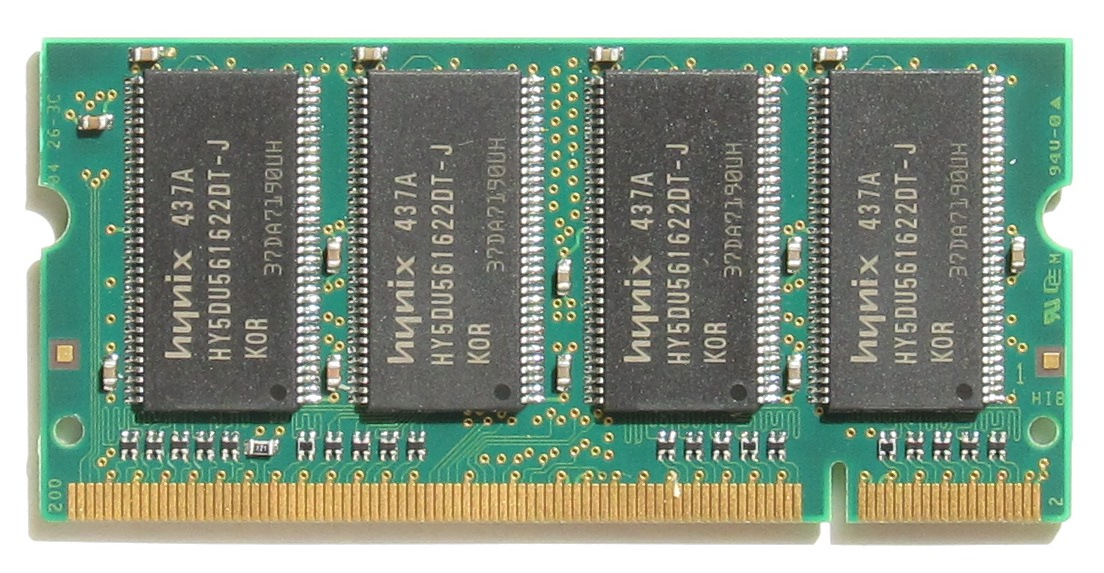
DRAM SO-DIMM

There has been a history of price fixing and accusations of price fixing in the market for dynamic random-access memory (DRAM), the main type of random access memory used in mobile phones, desktop computers and servers.

In 2002, the United States Department of Justice began a probe into the activities of DRAM manufacturers in response to complaints by US computer makers, including Dell and Gateway. The computer makers said that inflated DRAM pricing was causing them lost profits and hindering their effectiveness in the marketplace, in violation of the Sherman Antitrust Act.

To date, five manufacturers have pleaded guilty to their involvement in an international price-fixing conspiracy between July 1, 1998, and June 15, 2002, including Hynix, Infineon, Micron Technology, Samsung, and Elpida.

== 2002–2005 ==
"In December 2003, the Department charged Alfred P. Censullo, a Regional Sales Manager for Micron Technology Inc., with obstruction of justice in violation of 18 U.S.C. § 1503. Censullo pleaded guilty to the charge and admitted to having withheld and altered documents responsive to a grand jury subpoena served on Micron in June 2002."

On 20 October 2004, Infineon also pleaded guilty. The company was fined $160 million for its involvement, then the third largest antitrust fine in US history. In April 2005, Hynix Semiconductor was fined $185 million after they also admitted guilt. In October 2005, Samsung entered a guilty plea in connection with the cartel.

On 5 April 2006, Sun Woo Lee, Senior Manager of DRAM at Samsung Electronics, entered into a plea bargain with the US Government for his involvement in the price fixing conspiracy. Following the plea agreement he was sentenced to 8 months in prison and fined US$250,000. Lee was subsequently promoted to President of Samsung Germany in 2009, and then President of Samsung Europe in 2014.

On 19 May, 2010, European antitrust regulators also fined nine semiconductor manufacturers more than €331 million for the cartel that operated back in 2002. The companies fined are Samsung Electronics, Infineon, Hynix Semiconductor, Elpida Memory, NEC Electronics, Hitachi, Toshiba, Mitsubishi Electric and Nanya Technology. Micron Technology received immunity for blowing the whistle on the cartel and will not be fined for its involvement.

== 2017–2018 ==
On 27 April 2018, Hagens Berman filed a failed class-action lawsuit against Samsung, Hynix, and Micron in U.S. District Court alleging the trio engaged in DRAM price fixing causing prices to skyrocket through 2016 and 2017. Between June 2016 and January 2018, the price of DRAM nearly tripled.

During the same period, retail prices for consumer PC RAM kits roughly doubled as upstream DRAM cost increases flowed through to the retail channel.

The district court ruled in favor of Samsung, SK Hynix, and Micron and dismissed the lawsuit. This dismissal was affirmed on appeal by the United States Court of Appeals for the Ninth Circuit, which ruled in March 2022 that the plaintiffs did not offer sufficient plausible evidence for their allegations to make a case under the Sherman Antitrust Act and that the district court properly dismissed the lawsuit.

== 2026 ==
On 25 June 2026, Marc Garciaguirre filed a class-action lawsuit against Samsung, SK Hynix and Micron in the California Northern District Court alleging that the three companies have engaged again in DRAM price fixing by coordinating a shift of production from DDR3/DDR4 to High Bandwidth Memory (HBM), causing prices to skyrocket by 700% over the past four years.

On 14 November 2026, judge Noël Wise denied Micron, Samsung, and SK hynix’s motion to have the case dismissed. The three companies claimed the lawsuit was a repeat of the previous antitrust in 2018. The plaintiffs had established new evidence that suggested collusion between the three memory chip manufacturers.
