= Sun Woo Lee =

South Korean business executive

- Born: Sun Woo Lee (이선우)
- Employer: Samsung Electronics (1984–present)

Sun Woo 'Sunny' Lee (Korean: 이선우) is a South Korean business executive, and is the former president and chief executive officer of Samsung Electronics Europe, previously serving as chief operating officer of Samsung Electronics Germany.

In 2006 Lee was imprisoned for eight months and fined USD 250,000 for his involvement at Samsung in DRAM price fixing with DRAM competitors Hynix, Infineon, Micron Technology, and Elpida.

== Early life and education ==
Lee has a BA degree in German Studies, an MBA from Bradford University and an MSc in information technology from the University of Warwick.

== Samsung ==
=== Early career ===
Lee joined Samsung in 1984. From 1989 to 1994 he worked as a marketing manager for storage media at Samsung Semiconductor Europe GmbH.

From January 2001 to June 2002, Lee was Senior Manager of DRAM Sales based in Seoul.

Between 2007 and 2009 Lee was President of Samsung Taiwan.

On 1 February 2009 Lee was appointed as President of Samsung Germany, a position he held until his appointment as Executive Vice President of the Global Visual Display Sales and Marketing Division in 2012.

In January 2014 Lee was promoted to president and chief executive officer of Samsung Electronics Europe, a position he held until his replacement by YH Eom in 2015.

== DRAM price fixing scandal ==
In a Northern California district court in April 2006, Lee entered into a plea agreement with the U.S government for his criminal involvement in price fixing the U.S DRAM market. The plea agreement resulted in a sentence of eight months in prison and a USD 250,000 fine, and prevented the case going to trial in which evidence would have been formally presented.

Following the sentencing, Samsung issued a statement saying that it was "strongly committed to fair competition and ethical practices and forbids anticompetitive behaviour".

Lee was subsequently promoted to President of Samsung Germany in 2009, and then President of Samsung Europe in 2014.
