= Computer memory =

Component that stores information

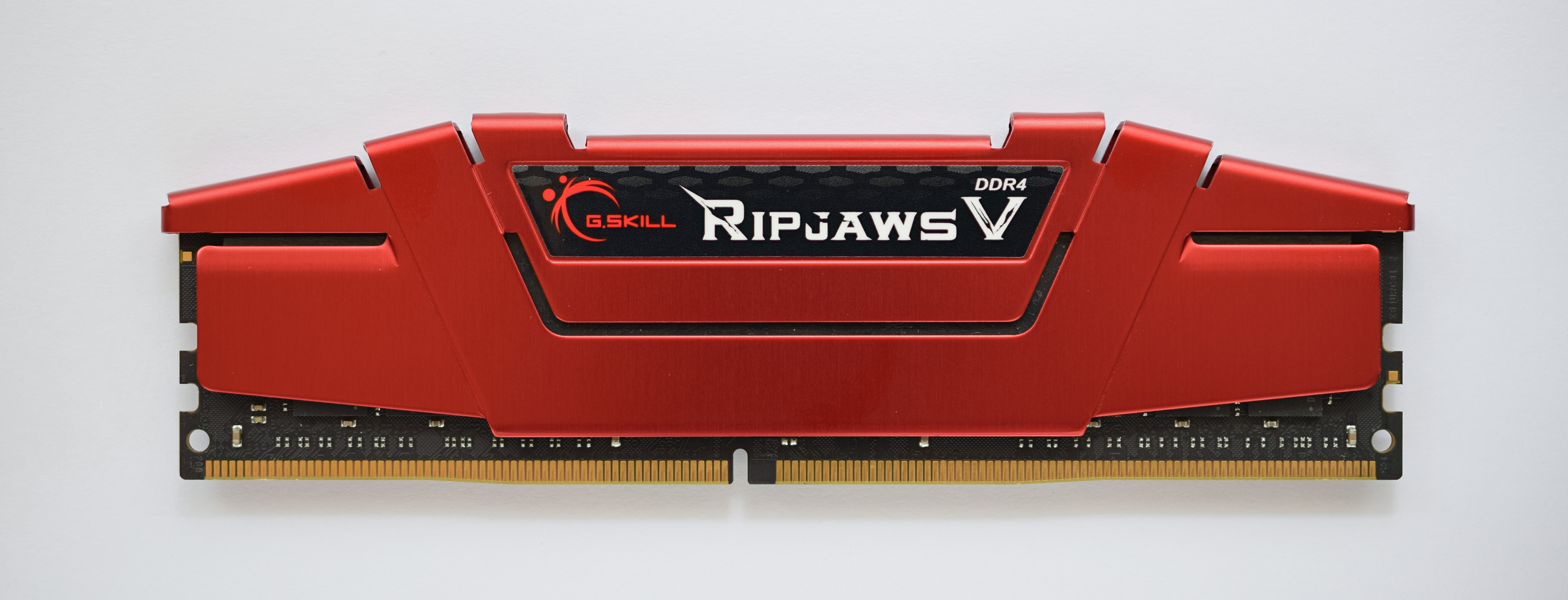
DDR4 SDRAM module. As of 2021, over 90 percent of computer memory used in PCs and servers was of this type.

Computer memory stores information, such as data and programs, for immediate use in the computer; instructions fetched by the computer, and data fetched and stored by those instructions, are located in computer memory. The terms memory, main memory, and primary storage are also used for computer memory.

Computer memory is often referred to as RAM, meaning random-access memory, although some older forms of computer memory, such as drum memory, are not random-access. Archaic synonyms for main memory include core (for magnetic-core memory) and store.

Main memory operates at a high speed compared to mass storage which is slower but less expensive per bit and higher in capacity. Besides storing opened programs and data being actively processed, computer memory serves as a mass storage cache and write buffer to improve both reading and writing performance. Operating systems typically borrow RAM capacity for caching so long as it is not needed by running software. If needed, contents of the computer memory can be transferred to storage; a common way of doing this is through a memory management technique called virtual memory.

Modern computer memory is implemented as semiconductor memory, where data is stored within memory cells built from MOS transistors and other components on an integrated circuit. There are two main kinds of semiconductor memory: volatile and non-volatile. Examples of non-volatile memory are flash memory and ROM, PROM, EPROM, and EEPROM memory. Examples of volatile memory are dynamic random-access memory (DRAM) used for primary storage and static random-access memory (SRAM) used mainly for CPU cache.

Most semiconductor memory is organized into memory cells each storing one bit (0 or 1). Flash memory organization includes both one bit per memory cell and a multi-level cell capable of storing multiple bits per cell. The memory cells are grouped into words of fixed word length, for example, 1, 2, 4, 8, 16, 32, 64 or 128 bits. Each word can be accessed by a binary address of N bits, making it possible to store 2^{N} words in the memory.

== History ==
Historical lowest retail price of computer memory and storage

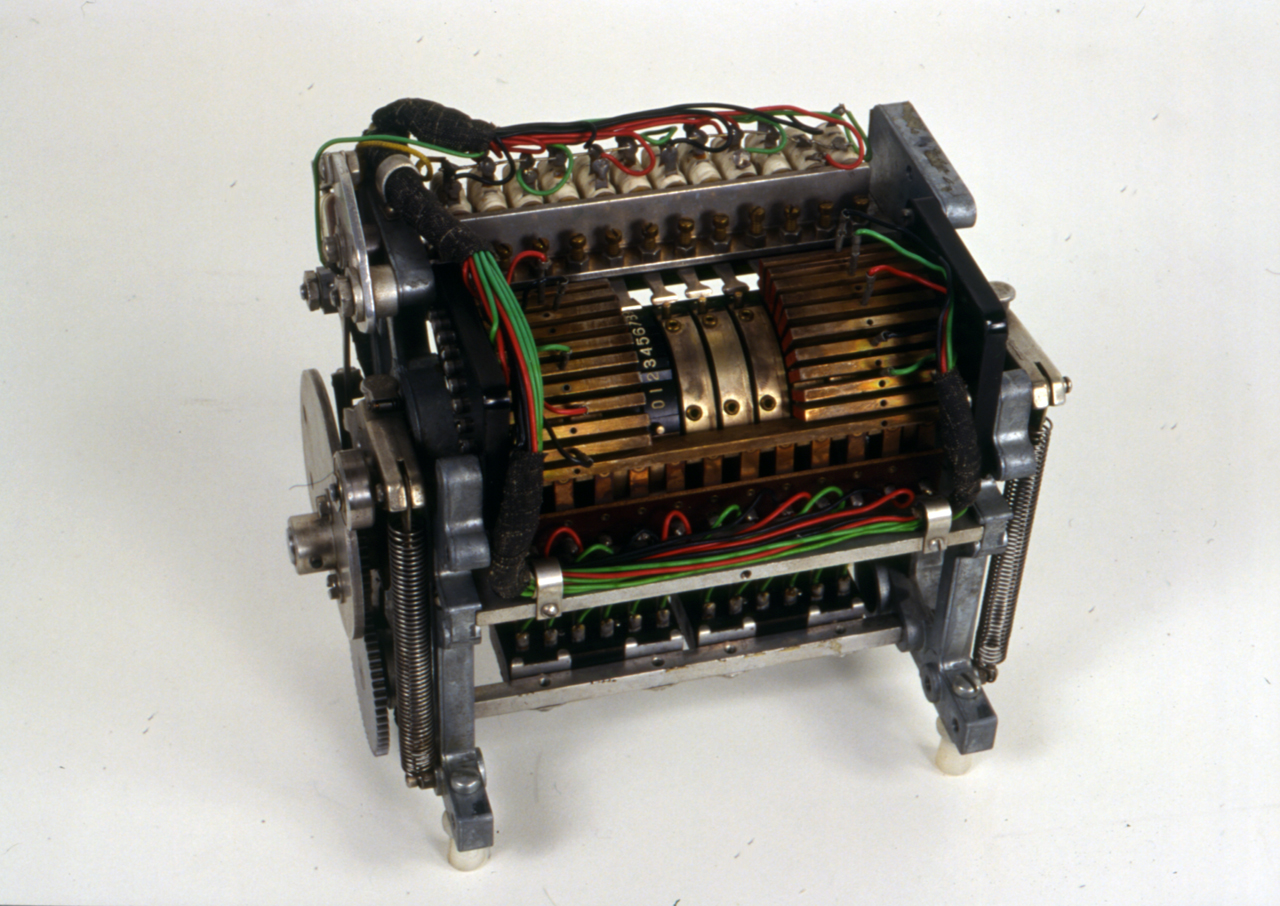
Electromechanical memory used in the IBM 602, an early punch multiplying calculator

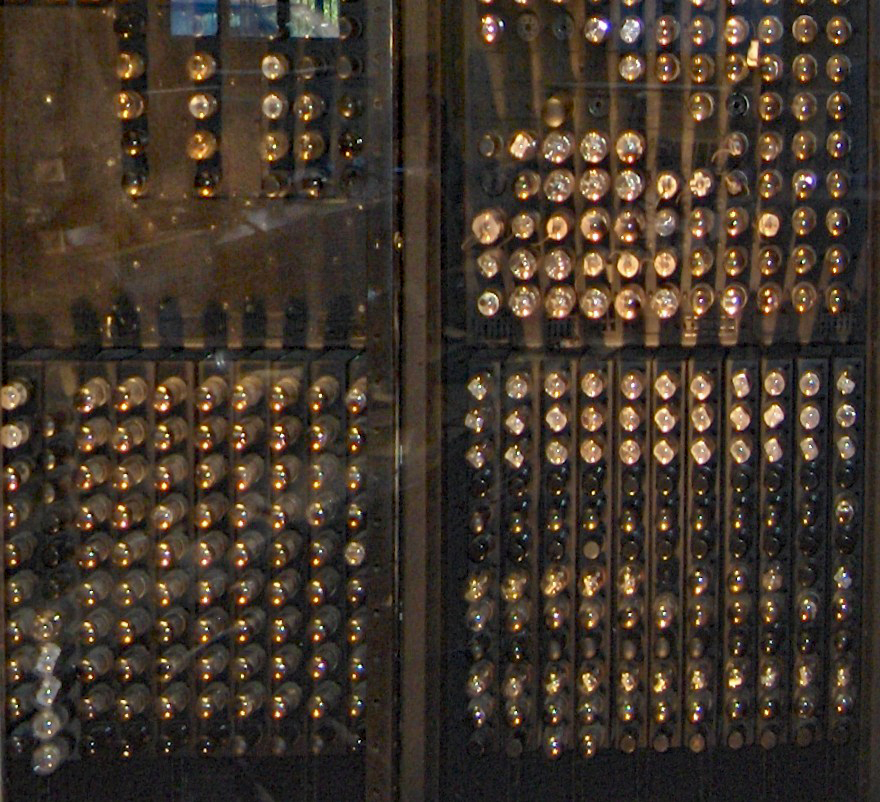
Detail of the back of a section of ENIAC, showing vacuum tubes

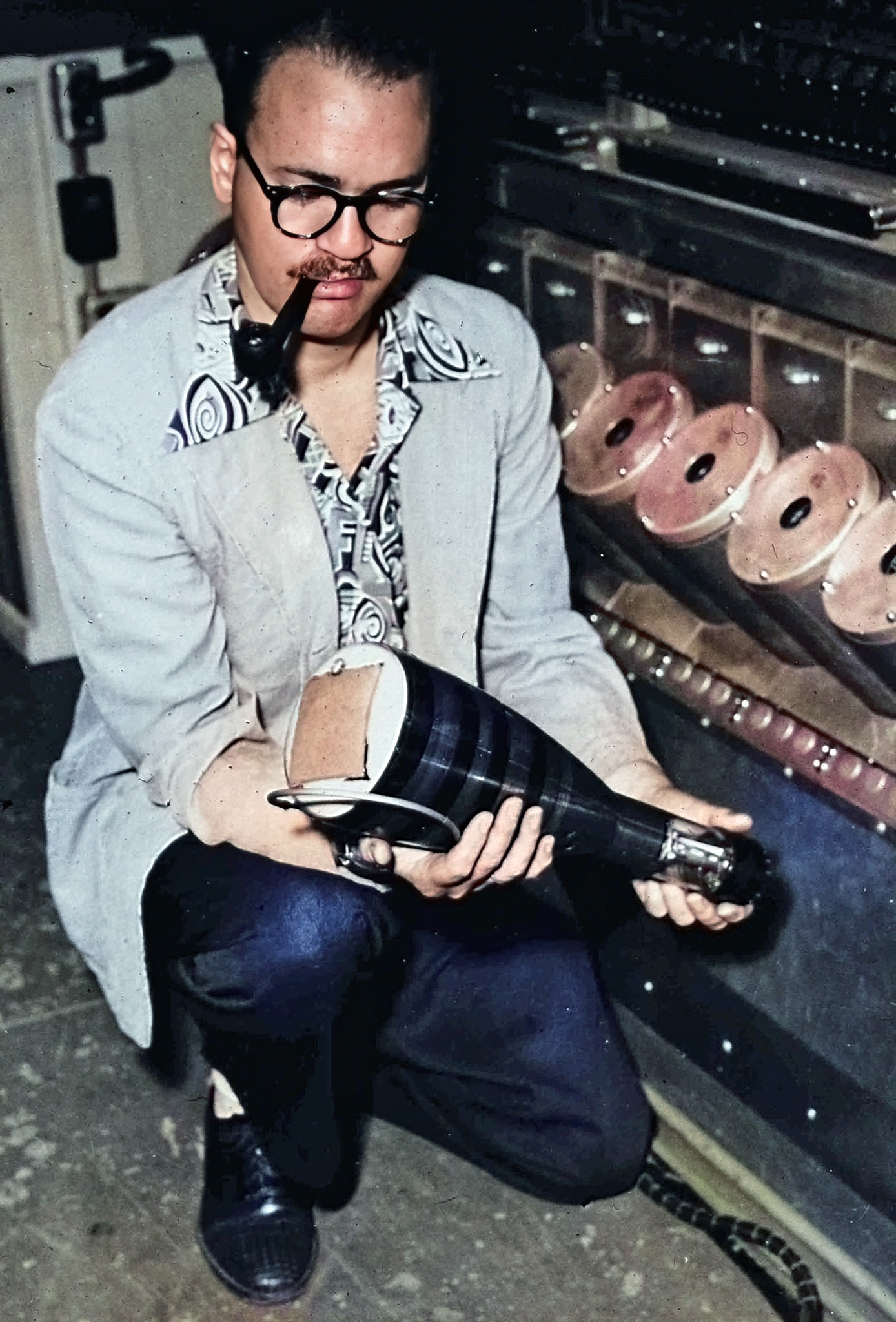
Williams tube used as memory in the IAS computer c. 1951

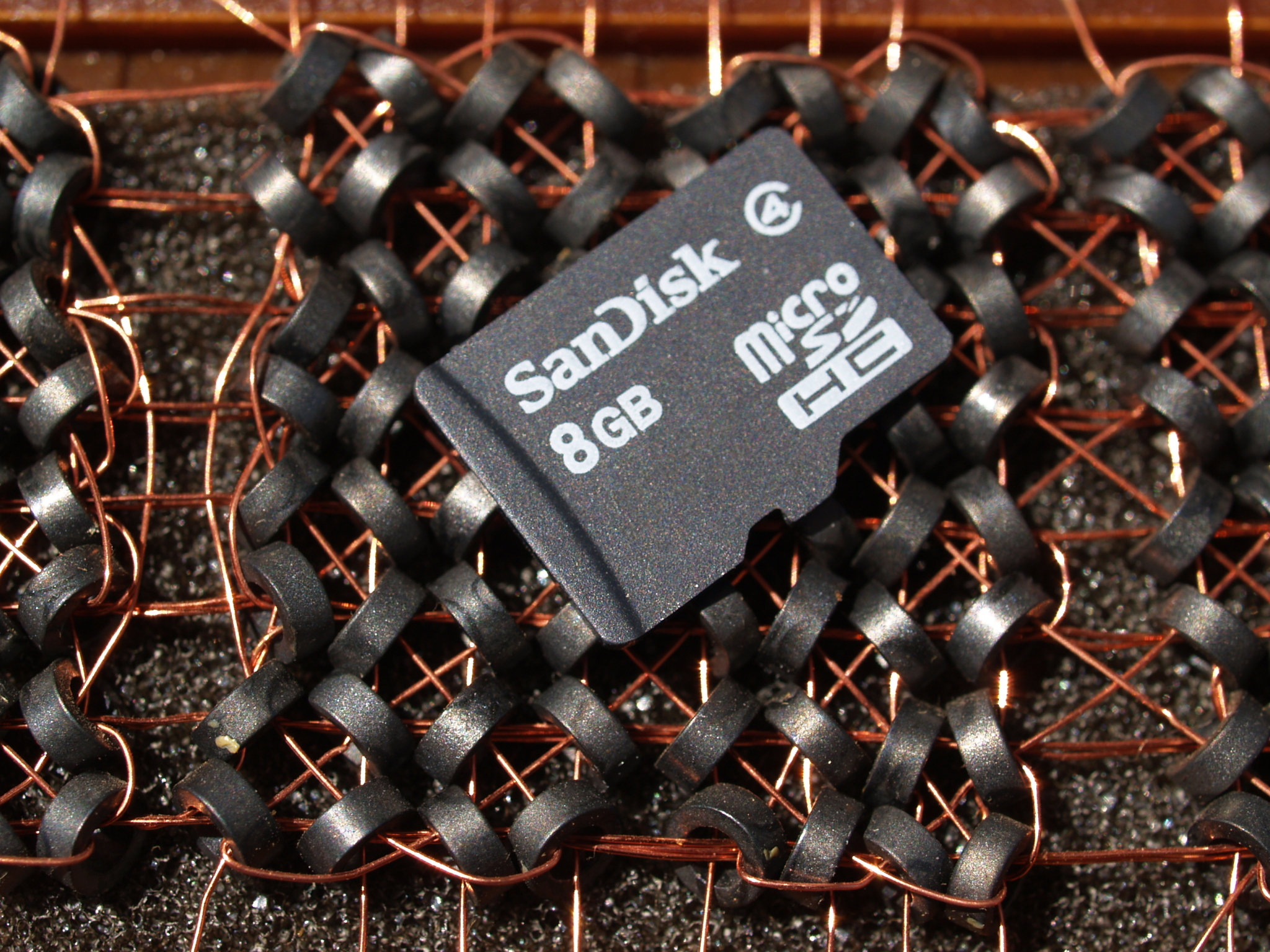
8 GB microSDHC card on top of 8 bytes of magnetic-core memory (1 core is 1 bit.)

In the early 1940s, memory technology often permitted a capacity of a few bytes. The first electronic programmable digital computer, the ENIAC, using thousands of vacuum tubes, could perform simple calculations involving 20 numbers of ten decimal digits stored in the vacuum tubes.

The next significant advance in computer memory came with acoustic delay-line memory, developed by J. Presper Eckert in the early 1940s. Through the construction of a glass tube filled with mercury and plugged at each end with a quartz crystal, delay lines could store bits of information in the form of sound waves propagating through the mercury, with the quartz crystals acting as transducers to read and write bits. Delay-line memory was limited to a capacity of up to a few thousand bits.

Two alternatives to the delay line, the Williams tube and Selectron tube, originated in 1946, both using electron beams in glass tubes as means of storage. Using cathode ray tubes, Fred Williams invented the Williams tube, which was the first random-access computer memory. The Williams tube was able to store more information than the Selectron tube (the Selectron was limited to 256 bits, while the Williams tube could store thousands) and was less expensive. The Williams tube was nevertheless frustratingly sensitive to environmental disturbances.

Efforts began in the late 1940s to find non-volatile memory. Magnetic-core memory allowed for memory recall after power loss. It was developed by Frederick W. Viehe and An Wang in the late 1940s, and improved by Jay Forrester and Jan A. Rajchman in the early 1950s, before being commercialized with the Whirlwind I computer in 1953. Magnetic-core memory was the dominant form of memory until the development of MOS semiconductor memory in the 1960s.

The first semiconductor memory was implemented as a flip-flop circuit in the early 1960s using bipolar transistors. Semiconductor memory made from discrete devices was first shipped by Texas Instruments to the United States Air Force in 1961. In the same year, the concept of solid-state memory on an integrated circuit (IC) chip was proposed by applications engineer Bob Norman at Fairchild Semiconductor. The first bipolar semiconductor memory IC chip was the SP95 introduced by IBM in 1965. While semiconductor memory offered improved performance over magnetic-core memory, it remained larger and more expensive and did not displace magnetic-core memory until the late 1960s.

=== MOS memory ===
The invention of the metal–oxide–semiconductor field-effect transistor (MOSFET) enabled the practical use of metal–oxide–semiconductor (MOS) transistors as memory cell storage elements. MOS memory was developed by John Schmidt at Fairchild Semiconductor in 1964. In addition to higher performance, MOS semiconductor memory was cheaper and consumed less power than magnetic core memory. In 1965, J. Wood and R. Ball of the Royal Radar Establishment proposed digital storage systems that use CMOS (complementary MOS) memory cells, in addition to MOSFET power devices for the power supply, switched cross-coupling, switches and delay-line storage. The development of silicon-gate MOS integrated circuit (MOS IC) technology by Federico Faggin at Fairchild in 1968 enabled the production of MOS memory chips. NMOS memory was commercialized by IBM in the early 1970s. MOS memory overtook magnetic core memory as the dominant memory technology in the early 1970s.

The two main types of volatile random-access memory (RAM) are static random-access memory (SRAM) and dynamic random-access memory (DRAM). Bipolar SRAM was invented by Robert Norman at Fairchild Semiconductor in 1963, followed by the development of MOS SRAM by John Schmidt at Fairchild in 1964. SRAM became an alternative to magnetic-core memory, but requires six transistors for each bit of data. Commercial use of SRAM began in 1965, when IBM introduced their SP95 SRAM chip for the System/360 Model 95.

Toshiba introduced bipolar DRAM memory cells for its Toscal BC-1411 electronic calculator in 1965. While it offered improved performance, bipolar DRAM could not compete with the lower price of the then dominant magnetic-core memory. MOS technology is the basis for modern DRAM. In 1966, Robert H. Dennard at the IBM Thomas J. Watson Research Center was working on MOS memory. While examining the characteristics of MOS technology, he found it was possible to build capacitors, and that storing a charge or no charge on the MOS capacitor could represent the 1 and 0 of a bit, while the MOS transistor could control writing the charge to the capacitor. This led to his development of a single-transistor DRAM memory cell. In 1967, Dennard filed a patent for a single-transistor DRAM memory cell based on MOS technology. This led to the first commercial DRAM IC chip, the Intel 1103 in October 1970. Synchronous dynamic random-access memory (SDRAM) later debuted with the Samsung KM48SL2000 chip in 1992.

The term memory is also often used to refer to non-volatile memory including read-only memory (ROM) through modern flash memory. Programmable read-only memory (PROM) was invented by Wen Tsing Chow in 1956, while working for the Arma Division of the American Bosch Arma Corporation. In 1967, Dawon Kahng and Simon Sze of Bell Labs proposed that the floating gate of a MOS semiconductor device could be used for the cell of a reprogrammable ROM, which led to Dov Frohman of Intel inventing EPROM (erasable PROM) in 1971. EEPROM (electrically erasable PROM) was developed by Yasuo Tarui, Yutaka Hayashi and Kiyoko Naga at the Electrotechnical Laboratory in 1972. Flash memory was invented by Fujio Masuoka at Toshiba in the early 1980s. Masuoka and colleagues presented the invention of NOR flash in 1984, and then NAND flash in 1987. Toshiba commercialized NAND flash memory in 1987.

Developments in technology and economies of scale have made possible so-called very large memory (VLM) computers.

== Volatility categories ==
=== Volatile memory ===
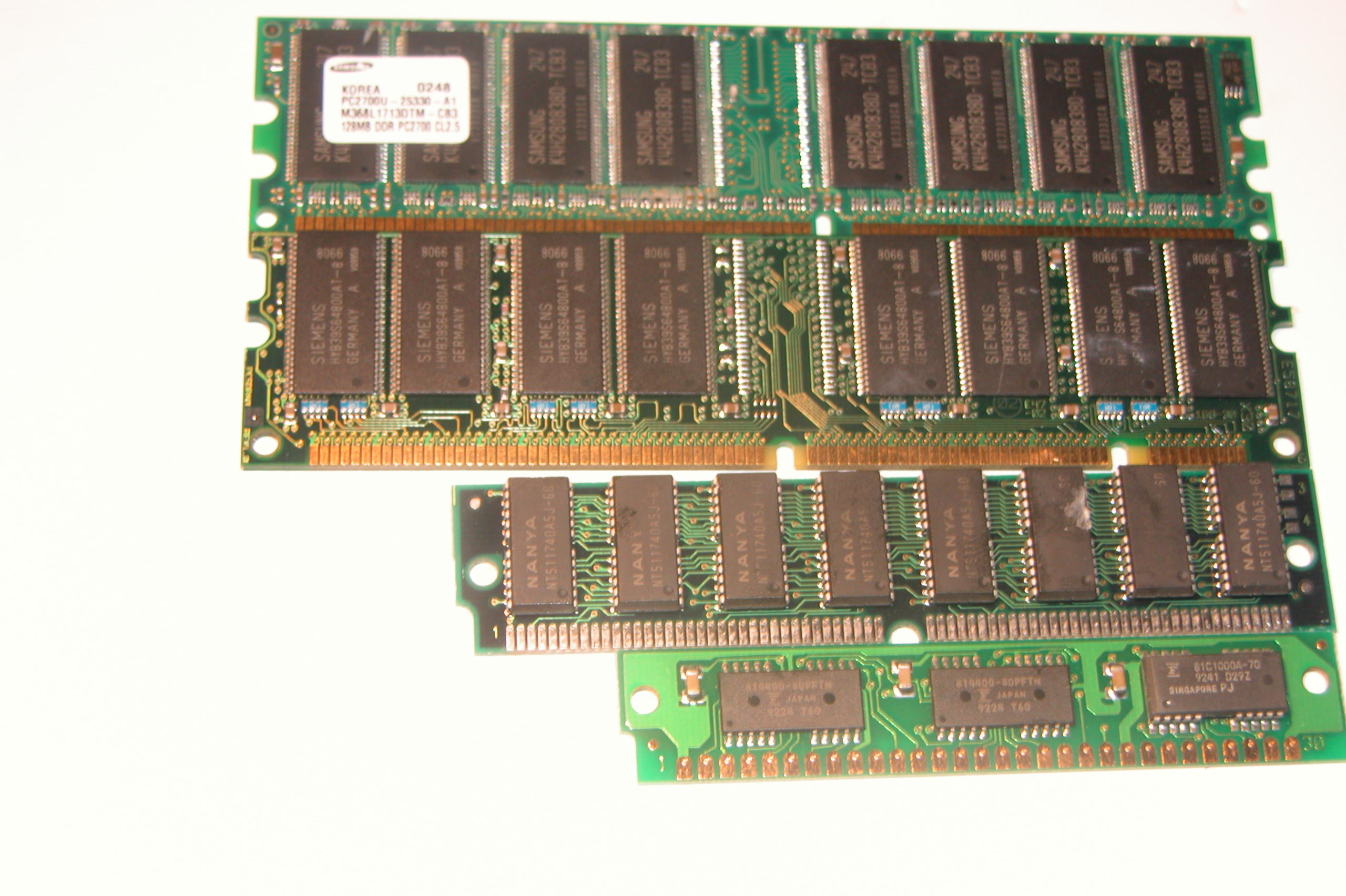
Various memory modules containing different types of DRAM (from top to bottom): DDR SDRAM, SDRAM, EDO DRAM, and FPM DRAM

Volatile memory is computer memory that requires power to maintain the stored information. Most modern semiconductor volatile memory is either static RAM (SRAM) or dynamic RAM (DRAM). (Note: Other volatile memory technologies that have attempted to compete or replace SRAM and DRAM include Z-RAM and A-RAM.) DRAM dominates for desktop system memory. SRAM is used for CPU cache. SRAM is also found in small embedded systems requiring little memory.

SRAM retains its contents as long as the power is connected and may use a simpler interface, but commonly uses six transistors per bit. Dynamic RAM is more complicated for interfacing and control, needing regular refresh cycles to prevent losing its contents, but uses only one transistor and one capacitor per bit, allowing it to reach much higher densities and much cheaper per-bit costs.

=== Non-volatile memory ===
Non-volatile memory can retain the stored information even when not powered. Examples of non-volatile memory include read-only memory, flash memory, most types of magnetic computer storage devices (e.g. hard disk drives, floppy disks and magnetic tape), optical discs, and early computer storage methods such as magnetic drum, paper tape and punched cards.

Non-volatile memory technologies under development include ferroelectric RAM, programmable metallization cell, Spin-transfer torque magnetic RAM, SONOS, resistive random-access memory, racetrack memory, Nano-RAM, 3D XPoint, and millipede memory.

=== Semi-volatile memory ===
A third category of memory is semi-volatile. The term is used to describe a memory that has some limited non-volatile duration after power is removed, but then data is ultimately lost. A typical goal when using a semi-volatile memory is to provide the high performance and durability associated with volatile memories while providing some benefits of non-volatile memory.

For example, some non-volatile memory types experience wear when written. A worn cell has increased volatility but otherwise continues to work. Data locations which are written frequently can thus be directed to use worn circuits. As long as the location is updated within some known retention time, the data stays valid. After a period of time without update, the value is copied to a less-worn circuit with longer retention. Writing first to the worn area allows a high write rate while avoiding wear on the not-worn circuits.

As a second example, an STT-RAM can be made non-volatile by building large cells, but doing so raises the cost per bit and power requirements and reduces the write speed. Using small cells improves cost, power, and speed, but leads to semi-volatile behavior. In some applications, the increased volatility can be managed to provide many benefits of a non-volatile memory, for example by removing power but forcing a wake-up before data is lost; or by caching read-only data and discarding the cached data if the power-off time exceeds the non-volatile threshold.

The term semi-volatile is also used to describe semi-volatile behavior constructed from other memory types, such as nvSRAM, which combines SRAM and a non-volatile memory on the same chip, where an external signal copies data from the volatile memory to the non-volatile memory, but if power is removed before the copy occurs, the data is lost. Another example is battery-backed RAM, which uses an external battery to power the memory device in case of external power loss. If power is off for an extended period of time, the battery may run out, resulting in data loss.

== Management ==
Proper management of memory is vital for a computer system to operate properly. Modern operating systems have complex systems to properly manage memory. Failure to do so can lead to bugs or slow performance.

=== Bugs ===
Improper management of memory is a common cause of bugs and security vulnerabilities, including the following types:

- A memory leak occurs when a program requests memory from the operating system and never returns the memory when it is done with it. A program with this bug will gradually require more and more memory until the program fails as the operating system runs out.
- A segmentation fault results when a program tries to access memory that it does not have permission to access. Generally, a program doing so will be terminated by the operating system.
- A buffer overflow occurs when a program writes data to the end of its allocated space and then continues to write data beyond this to memory that has been allocated for other purposes. This may result in erratic program behavior, including memory access errors, incorrect results, a crash, or a breach of system security. They are thus the basis of many software vulnerabilities and can be maliciously exploited.

=== Virtual memory ===
Virtual memory is a system where physical memory is managed by the operating system typically with assistance from a memory management unit, which is part of many modern CPUs. It allows multiple types of memory to be used. For example, some data can be stored in RAM while other data is stored on a hard drive (e.g. in a swapfile), functioning as an extension of the cache hierarchy. This offers several advantages. Computer programmers no longer need to worry about where their data is physically stored or whether the user's computer will have enough memory. The operating system will place actively used data in RAM, which is much faster than hard disks. When the amount of RAM is not sufficient to run all the current programs, it can result in a situation where the computer spends more time moving data from RAM to disk and back than it does accomplishing tasks; this is known as thrashing.

=== Protected memory ===
Protected memory is a system where each program is given an area of memory to use and is prevented from going outside that range. If the operating system detects that a program has tried to alter memory that does not belong to it, the program is terminated (or otherwise restricted or redirected). This way, only the offending program crashes, and other programs are not affected by the misbehavior (whether accidental or intentional). Use of protected memory greatly enhances both the reliability and security of a computer system.

Without protected memory, it is possible that a bug in one program will alter the memory used by another program. This will cause that other program to run off of corrupted memory with unpredictable results. If the operating system's memory is corrupted, the entire computer system may crash and need to be rebooted. At times programs intentionally alter the memory used by other programs. This is done by viruses and malware to take over computers. It may also be used benignly by desirable programs which are intended to modify other programs, debuggers, for example, to insert breakpoints or hooks.

== See also ==
- Memory geometry
- Memory hierarchy
- Memory organization
- Processor registers store data but normally are not considered as memory, since they only store one word and do not include an addressing mechanism.
- Universal memory, memory combining both large capacity and high speed
