= Non-volatile random-access memory =

Type of computer memory

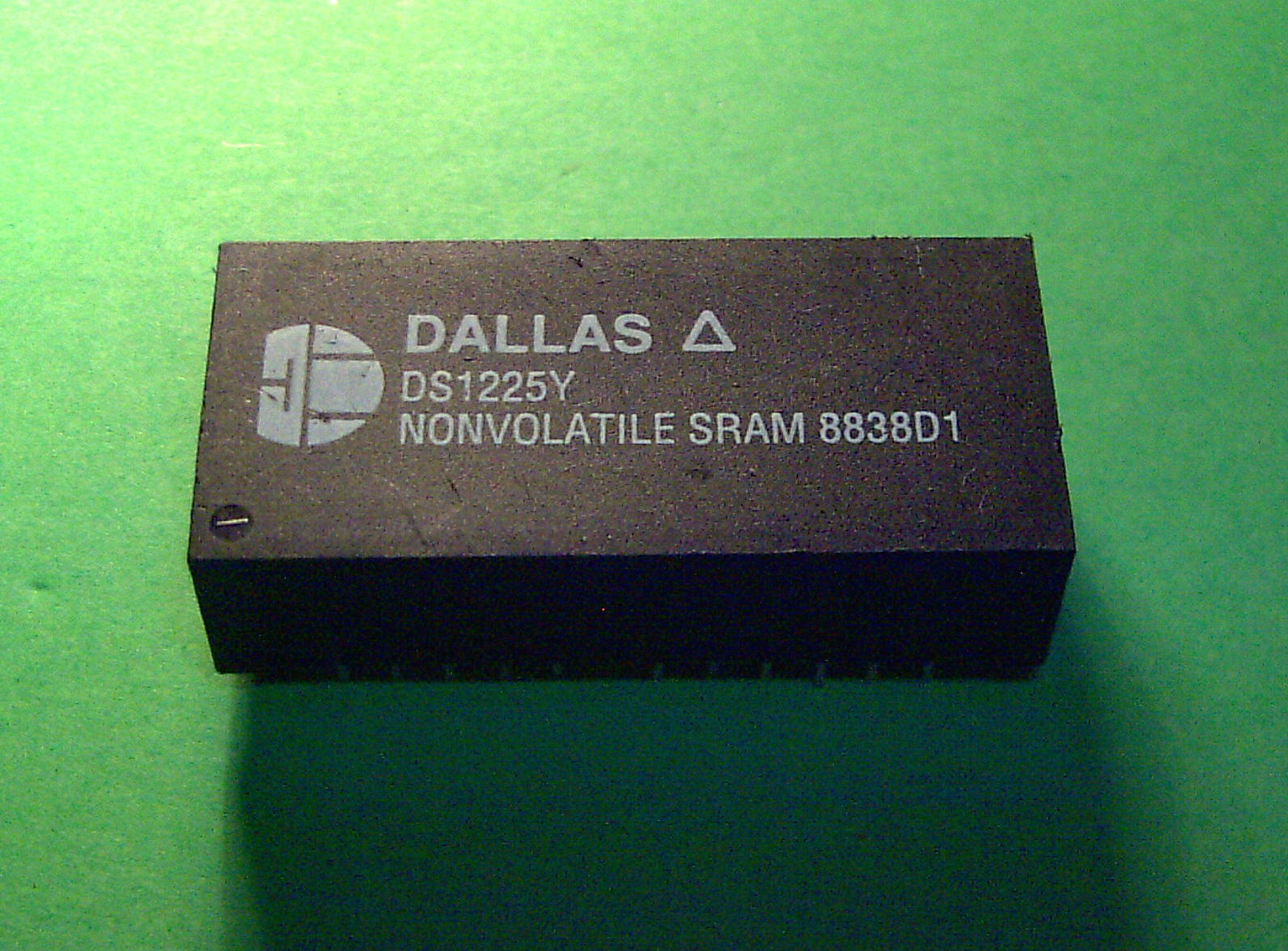
Non-volatile RAM uses various technologies and form factors, including this tall IC package with internal battery used to power its SRAM and retain contents when system power is lost.

Non-volatile random-access memory (NVRAM) is random-access memory that retains data without applied power. This is in contrast to dynamic random-access memory (DRAM) and static random-access memory (SRAM), which both maintain data only for as long as power is applied, or forms of sequential-access memory such as magnetic tape, which cannot be randomly accessed but which retains data indefinitely without electric power.

Read-only memory devices can be used to store system firmware in embedded systems such as an automotive ignition system control or home appliance. They are also used to hold the initial processor instructions required to bootstrap a computer system. Read-write memory such as NVRAM can be used to store calibration constants, passwords, or setup information, and may be integrated into a microcontroller.

If the main memory of a computer system were non-volatile, it would greatly reduce the time required to start a system after a power interruption. Current existing types of semiconductor non-volatile memory have limitations in speed (bandwidth and latency), bit density, power consumption, or operating life that make them impractical for main memory. Development is going on for the use of non-volatile memory chips as a system's main memory, as persistent memory. A standard for persistent memory known as NVDIMM-P has been published in 2021.

== Early NVRAMs ==
Some early computers used magnetic drum, which was non-volatile as a byproduct of its construction. The industry moved to magnetic-core memory in the later 1950s, which stored data in the polarity of small magnets. Since the magnets held their state even with the power removed, core memory was also non-volatile. Other memory types required constant power to retain data, such as vacuum tube or solid-state flip-flops, Williams tube, and semiconductor memory (static or dynamic RAM).

Advances in semiconductor fabrication in the 1970s led to a new generation of solid-state memories that magnetic-core memory could not match on cost or density. Today, dynamic RAM forms the vast majority of a typical computer's main memory. Many systems require at least some non-volatile memory. Desktop computers require permanent storage of the instructions required to load the operating system. Embedded systems, such as an engine control computer for a car, must retain their instructions when power is removed. Many systems used a combination of RAM and some form of ROM for these roles.

Custom ROM integrated circuits were one solution. The memory contents were stored as a pattern of the last mask used for manufacturing the integrated circuit, and so could not be modified once completed.

PROM improved on this design, allowing the chip to be written electrically by the end-user. PROM consists of a series of diodes that are initially all set to a single value, 1, for instance. By applying higher power than normal, a selected diode can be burned out (like a fuse), thereby permanently setting that bit to 0. PROM facilitated prototyping and small-volume manufacturing. Many semiconductor manufacturers provided a PROM version of their mask ROM part so that development firmware could be tested before ordering a mask ROM.

Currently, the best-known form of both NV-RAM and EEPROM memory is flash memory. Some drawbacks to flash memory include the requirement to write it in larger blocks than many computers can automatically address, and the relatively limited longevity of flash memory due to its finite number of write-erase cycles (as of January 2010, most consumer flash products can withstand only around 100,000 rewrites before memory begins to deteriorate). Another drawback is the performance limitations preventing flash from matching the response times and, in some cases, the random addressability offered by traditional forms of RAM. Several newer technologies are attempting to replace flash in certain roles, and some even claim to be a truly universal memory, offering the performance of the best SRAM devices with the non-volatility of flash. As of June 2018, these alternatives have not yet become mainstream.

Those who required real RAM-like performance and non-volatility typically have had to use conventional RAM devices and a battery backup. For example, IBM PC and successors beginning with the IBM PC AT used nonvolatile BIOS memory, often called CMOS RAM or parameter RAM, and this was a common solution in other early microcomputer systems, like the original Apple Macintosh, which used a small amount of memory powered by a battery for storing basic setup information like the selected boot volume. (The original IBM PC and PC XT instead used DIP switches to represent up to 24 bits of system configuration data; DIP or similar switches are another, primitive type of programmable ROM device that was widely used in the 1970s and 1980s for very small amounts of data—typically no more than 8 bytes.) Before industry standardization on the IBM PC architecture, some other microcomputer models used battery-backed RAM more extensively: for example, in the TRS-80 Model 100/Tandy 102, all of the main memory (8 KB minimum, 32 KB maximum) is battery-backed SRAM. Also, in the 1990s, many video-game software cartridges (e.g., for consoles such as the Sega Genesis) included battery-backed RAM to retain saved games, high scores, and similar data. Also, some arcade video-game cabinets contain CPU modules that include battery-backed RAM containing keys for on-the-fly game software decryption. Much larger battery-backed memories are still used today as caches for high-speed databases that require a performance level newer NVRAM devices have not yet managed to meet.

== Floating-gate MOSFET ==
A huge advance in NVRAM technology was the introduction of the floating-gate MOSFET transistor, which led to the introduction of erasable programmable read-only memory, or EPROM. EPROM consists of a grid of transistors whose gate terminal (the switch) is protected by a high-quality insulator. By pushing electrons onto the base with the application of higher-than-normal voltage, the electrons become trapped on the far side of the insulator, thereby permanently switching the transistor on (1). EPROM can be reset to the base state (all 1s or 0s, depending on the design) by applying ultraviolet light (UV). The UV photons have enough energy to push the electrons through the insulator and return the base to a ground state. At that point, the EPROM can be rewritten from scratch.

An improvement on EPROM, EEPROM, soon followed. The extra E stands for electrically, referring to the ability to reset EEPROM using electricity instead of UV, making the devices much easier to use in practice. The bits are re-set with the application of even higher power through the other terminals of the transistor (source and drain). This high-power pulse, in effect, sucks the electrons through the insulator, returning it to the ground state. This process has the disadvantage of mechanically degrading the chip, however, so memory systems based on floating-gate transistors in general have short write-lifetimes, on the order of 10^{5} writes to any particular bit.

One approach to overcoming the rewrite count limitation is to have a standard SRAM where each bit is backed up by an EEPROM bit. In normal operation, the chip functions as a fast SRAM, and in case of power failure, the content is quickly transferred to the EEPROM part, from where it gets loaded back at the next power up. Such chips were called NOVRAMs by their manufacturers.

The basis of flash memory is identical to EEPROM but differs largely in internal layout. Flash allows its memory to be erased only in blocks, which greatly simplifies the internal wiring and allows for higher densities. Memory storage density is the main determinant of cost in most computer memory systems, and due to this, flash has evolved into one of the lowest-cost solid-state memory devices available. Starting around 2000, demand for ever-greater quantities of flash has driven manufacturers to use only the latest fabrication systems in order to increase density as much as possible. Although fabrication limits are starting to come into play, new "multi-bit" techniques appear to be able to double or quadruple the density even at existing line widths.

== Commercialized alternatives ==
Flash and EEPROM's limited write cycles are a serious problem for any real RAM-like role. In addition, the high power needed to write the cells is a problem in low-power roles, where NVRAM is often used. The power also needs time to be built up in a device known as a charge pump, which makes writing as much as 1,000 times slower than reading.

=== Ferroelectric RAM ===
To date, the only such system to enter widespread production is ferroelectric RAM, or F-RAM (sometimes referred to as FeRAM). F-RAM is a random-access memory similar in construction to DRAM but (instead of a dielectric layer like in DRAM) contains a thin ferroelectric film of lead zirconate titanate [Pb(Zr,Ti)O_{3}], commonly referred to as PZT. The Zr/Ti atoms in the PZT change polarity in an electric field, thereby producing a binary switch. Unlike RAM devices, F-RAM retains its data memory when power is shut off or interrupted, due to the PZT crystal maintaining polarity. Due to this crystal structure and how it is influenced, F-RAM offers distinct properties from other nonvolatile memory options, including extremely high endurance (exceeding 10^{16} access cycles for 3.3 V devices), ultra low power consumption (since F-RAM does not require a charge pump like other non-volatile memories), single-cycle write speeds, and gamma radiation tolerance. Ramtron International has developed, produced, and licensed ferroelectric RAM (F-RAM), and other companies that have licensed and produced F-RAM technology include Texas Instruments, Rohm, and Fujitsu.

=== Magnetoresistive RAM ===
Another approach to see major development effort is magnetoresistive random-access memory, or MRAM, which uses magnetic elements and, in general, operates in a fashion similar to core, at least for the first-generation technology. Only one MRAM chip has entered production to date: Everspin Technologies' 4 Mbit part, which is a first-generation MRAM that utilizes cross-point field-induced writing. Two second-generation techniques are currently in development: thermal-assisted switching (TAS), which is being developed by Crocus Technology, and spin-transfer torque (STT) on which Crocus, Hynix, IBM, and several other companies are working. STT-MRAM appears to allow for much higher densities than those of the first generation, but is lagging behind flash for the same reasons as FeRAM – enormous competitive pressures in the flash market.

=== Phase-change RAM ===
Another solid-state technology to see more than purely experimental development is phase-change RAM, or PRAM. PRAM is based on the same storage mechanism as writable CDs and DVDs, but reads them based on their changes in electrical resistance rather than changes in their optical properties. Considered a dark horse for some time, in 2006 Samsung announced the availability of a 512 Mbit part, considerably higher capacity than either MRAM or FeRAM. The areal density of these parts appears to be even higher than modern flash devices, the lower overall storage being due to the lack of multi-bit encoding. This announcement was followed by one from Intel and STMicroelectronics, who demonstrated their own PRAM devices at the 2006 Intel Developer Forum in October.

Intel and Micron Technology had a joint venture to sell PRAM devices under the names 3D XPoint, Optane and QuantX, which was discontinued in July 2022.

STMicroelectronics manufactures phase-change memory devices for automotive applications.

== Researched alternatives ==
=== Millipede memory ===
Perhaps one of the more innovative solutions is millipede memory, developed by IBM. Millipede is, in essence, a punched card rendered using nanotechnology in order to dramatically increase areal density. Although it was planned to introduce Millipede as early as 2003, unexpected problems in development delayed this until 2005, by which point it was no longer competitive with flash. In theory the technology offers storage densities on the order of 1 Tbit/in^{2} (≈155 Gbit/cm^{2}), greater than even the best hard drive technologies currently in use (perpendicular recording offers 636 Gbit/in^{2} (≈98.6 Gbit/cm^{2}) as of Dec. 2011), but future heat-assisted magnetic recording and patterned media together could support densities of 10 Tbit/in^{2} (≈1.55 Tbit/cm^{2}). However, slow read and write times for memories this large seem to limit this technology to hard drive replacements as opposed to high-speed RAM-like uses, although, to a very large degree, the same is true of flash as well.

=== FeFET memory ===
An alternative application of (hafnium oxide-based) ferroelectrics is Fe FET based memory, which utilises a ferroelectric between the gate and device of a field-effect transistor. Such devices are claimed to have the advantage that they utilise the same technology as HKMG (high-κ metal gate) based lithography, and scale to the same size as a conventional FET at a given process node. As of 2017, 32 Mbit devices have been demonstrated at 22 nm.

== See also ==
- NOVA (filesystem)
- Spin-transfer torque
- Spintronics
- UEFI
