= NRAM =

NRAM may refer to:

- Nano-RAM, a proprietary computer memory technology
- Landmark Mortgages, formerly NRAM plc, a British asset holding and management company
