= Everspin Technologies =

Public semiconductor company

Everspin Technologies, Inc.
- Type: Public
- Traded as: Nasdaq: MRAM; Russell Microcap component
- Industry: Semiconductors
- Founded: 2008; 18 years ago
- Headquarters: Chandler, Arizona, U.S.
- Area served: Worldwide
- Key people: Darin Billerbeck (chairman); Sanjeev Aggarwal (CEO & president)
- Products: MRAM memory; non-volatile memory products
- Revenue: ▲US$55.2 million (2025)
- Net income: ▼ −US$0.59 million (2025)
- Number of employees: 75 (2021)
- Website: everspin.com

Everspin Technologies, Inc. is a publicly traded semiconductor company headquartered in Chandler, Arizona, United States. It develops and manufactures discrete magnetoresistive RAM or magnetoresistive random-access memory (MRAM) products, including Toggle MRAM and Spin-Transfer Torque MRAM (STT-MRAM) product families. It also licenses its technology for use in embedded MRAM (eMRAM) applications, magnetic sensor applications as well as performing backend foundry services for eMRAM.

MRAM has the performance characteristics close to static random-access memory (SRAM) while also having the persistence of non-volatile memory, meaning that it will not lose its charge or data if power is removed from the system. This characteristic makes MRAM suitable for a large number of applications where persistence, performance, endurance and reliability are critical.

== History ==
The path to MRAM began in 1984 when the GMR effect was discovered by Albert Fert and Peter Grünberg. Twelve years later, in 1996, spin-transfer torque was proposed, enabling a magnetic tunnel junction or spin valve to be modified with a spin-polarized current. At this point, Motorola began its MRAM research, which led to its first MTJ in 1998. A year later, in 1999, Motorola developed a 256Kb MRAM Test Chip that enabled work to begin on productizing MRAM technology, which was followed by a patent for Toggle being granted to Motorola in 2002. The industry's first MRAM (4Mb) product became commercially available in 2006.

Much of the early MRAM work was done by Motorola, which spun off its semiconductor business in 2004, creating Freescale Semiconductor in 2008, which eventually spun out the MRAM business as Everspin Technologies.

In 2008, Everspin announced BGA packages for its MRAM product family that would support densities from 256Kb to 4Mb. The following year, in 2009, Everspin released its first-generation SPI MRAM product family and began shipping the first embedded MRAM samples in conjunction with GlobalFoundries. By 2010, Everspin had begun ramping production and sold its first million MRAMs. That same year qualification had completed on the industry's first embedded MRAM and 16Mb densities had been released.

With production ramping, Everspin shipped its four millionth stand-alone MRAM and its two millionth embedded MRAM by 2011. The 64Mb ST-MRAM, which was produced on a 90 nm process occurred in 2012.

In 2014 Everspin partnered with GlobalFoundries for production of in-plane and perpendicular MTJ ST-MRAM on 300mm wafers, utilizing 40 nm and 28 nm node processes.

By 2016, Everspin had announced it was shipping samples of the industry's first 256Mb ST-MRAM to customers, GlobalFoundries announced 22 nm embedded MRAM in conjunction with Everspin, and Everspin went public in an IPO later in the year on October 7.

In 2017, Everspin expanded support for MRAM to FPGAs by bringing DDR3 and DDR4 compatibility to its ST-MRAM products, making it compatible with Xilinx's UltraScale FPGA memory controller. On September 1, 2017, Kevin Conley was named Everspin CEO and President. Conley was the former CTO of SanDisk and brings enterprise storage expertise to the company.

In 2018, Everspin ramped production volumes of its 256Mb STT-MRAM and in December shipped its first customer samples of the 1Gb STT-MRAM.

In 2019, Everspin began pre-production of its 1Gb STT-MRAM in June and announced the expansion of the design-in ecosystem to enable system designers to implement the 1Gb ST-DDR4 product in their designs.

== Technology ==
MRAM uses the magnetism of electron spin to provide fast and enduring non-volatile memory. MRAM stores information in magnetic material that is integrated with silicon circuitry to deliver the speed of RAM with the non-volatility of Flash.

Headquartered in Chandler, Arizona, Everspin owns and operates a manufacturing line for its magnetic back-end-of-line wafer processing, using standard CMOS wafers from foundries. Everspin's current MRAM products are based on 180-nm, 130-nm, 40-nm, and 28-nm process technology nodes and industry standard packages.

== Products ==
=== Toggle MRAM ===
Toggle MRAM memory utilizes the magnetism of electron spin, enabling the storage of data without volatility or wear-out. Toggle MRAM utilizes a single transistor and a single MTJ cell in order to provide a durable, high-density memory. Because of the non-volatility of Toggle MRAM, data that is held in this memory is accessible for 20 years, at temperature (from -40c to 150c). The MTJ is composed of a fixed magnetic layer, a thin dielectric tunnel barrier, and a free magnetic layer. When a bias is applied to the Spin Toggle's MTJ, electrons that are spin polarized by the magnetic layers "tunnel" across the dielectric barrier. The MTJ device has a low resistance when the magnetic moment of the free layer is parallel to the fixed layer and a high resistance when the free layer moment is oriented anti-parallel to the fixed layer moment.

Production densities include 128Kb to 16Mb; available in Parallel and SPI interfaces; DFN, SOIC, BGA, and TSOP2 packages

=== Spin-transfer torque MRAM ===
Spin-transfer torque is a type of MRAM memory (STT-MRAM) built with a perpendicular MTJ that uses the spin-transfer torque property (the manipulation of the spin of electrons with a polarizing current) to manipulate the magnetic state of the free layer to program, or write, the bits in the memory array. Everspin's Perpendicular MTJ stack designs with high perpendicular magnetic anisotropy bring long data retention, small cell size, high density, high endurance, and low power. STT-MRAM has lower switching energy compared to Toggle MRAM, and can reach higher densities. STT-MRAM products from Everspin are compatible with JEDEC standard interfaces for DDR3 and DDR4 (with some modifications needed for MRAM technology). In this mode, the DDR3 product can act like a persistent (non-volatile) DRAM and require no refresh, while the DDR4 product has self-refresh mode under idle state conditions. The DDR4 compatible STT-MRAM devices, with a 1Gb density, began early sampling to customers in early August 2017. In June 2019, the 1Gb STT-MRAM entered pilot production. In 2020 GlobalFoundries started using its 12nm production platform for Everspin's MRAM. The companies worked together since 2014, when GlobalFoundries produced 48nm MRAM products.

=== nvNITRO Storage Accelerators ===
Everspin developed nvNITRO products to address storage requirements that are typically being served by NVMe products. There are two different form factors, HHHL (PCIe Gen3 x8), and U.2. These devices can store up to 1GB in data today, with greater capacities planned as MRAM densities scale up over time. nvNITRO products can handle both NVMe 1.1 and block storage requirements. Because these products are built on MRAM, they do not require the battery backup of typical magnetic storage products in order to protect data in flight. Everspin officially launched the first version of the nvNITRO in August 2017, based on 256Mb ST-MRAM (1GB and 2GB capacities). Future versions will be based on the upcoming 1Gb ST-MRAM densities which recently began sampling to customers. SMART Modular Technologies has signed up as an nvNITRO technology partner and will sell nvNITRO storage accelerators under its brand name.

=== Embedded MRAM ===
Everspin has partnered with GlobalFoundries to integrate MRAM into standard CMOS technology, enabling it to be integrated, non-destructively, into CMOS logic designs. The embedded MRAM can replace embedded flash, DRAM or SRAM in any CMOS design, delivering similar capacities of memory with non-volatility. Embedded MRAM can be integrated into 65 nm, 40 nm, 28 nm and now in GlobalFoundries 22FDX process which is 22 nm and utilizes fully depleted silicon-on-insulator (FD-SOI).
