= 3D XPoint =

Discontinued computer memory type

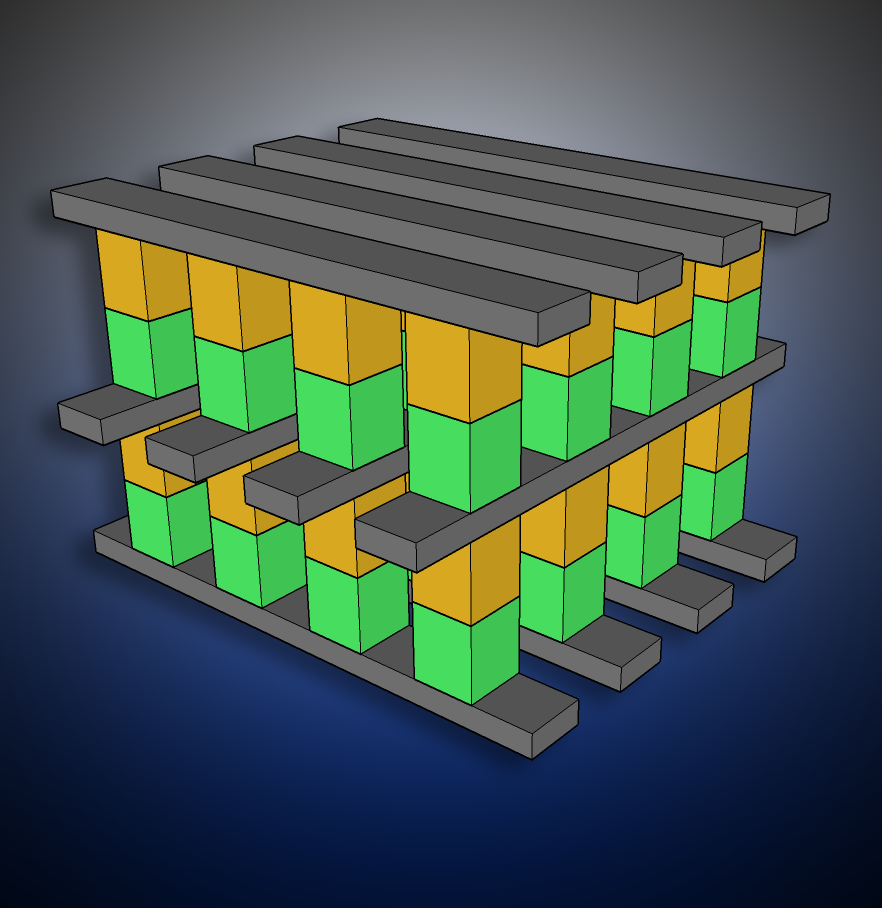
3D Cross Point 2 layer diagram

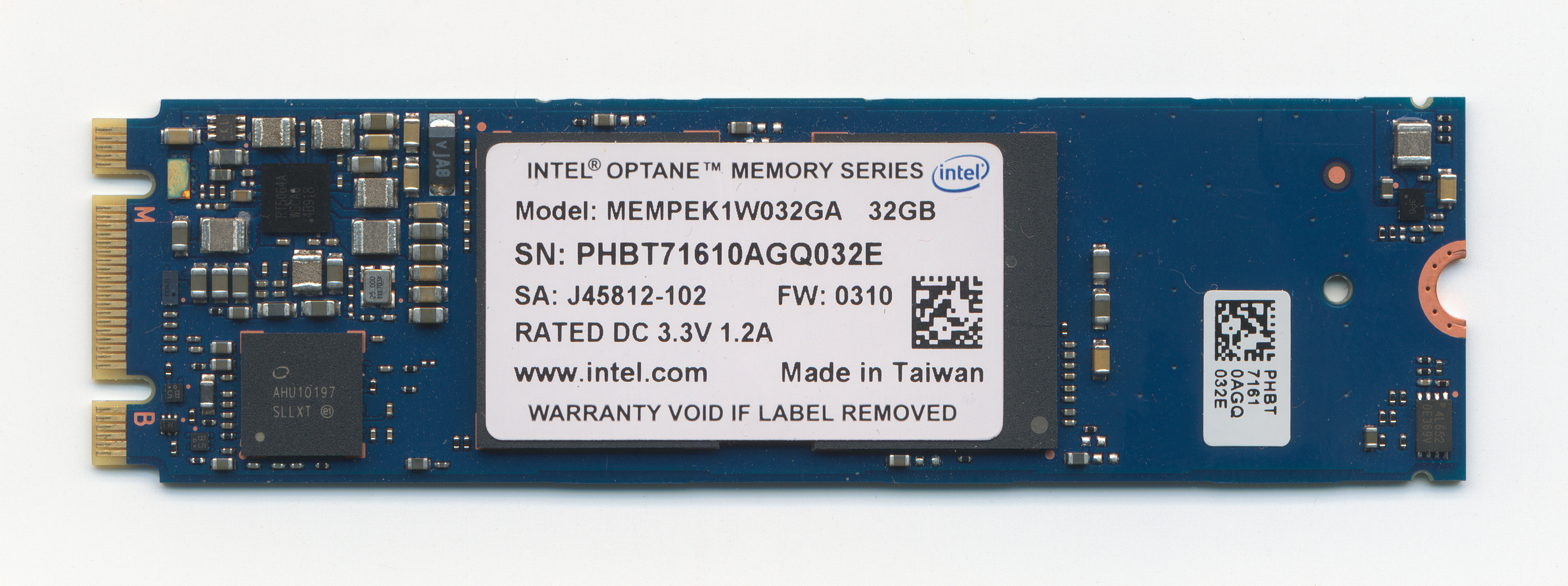
Intel Optane in M.2 card format

3D XPoint (pronounced three-D cross point) is a discontinued non-volatile memory (NVM) technology developed jointly by Intel and Micron Technology. It was announced in July 2015 and was available on the open market under the brand name Optane (Intel) from April 2017 to July 2022. Bit storage is based on a change of bulk resistance, in conjunction with a stackable cross-grid data access array, using a technology known as Ovonic Threshold Switch (OTS). Initial prices were less than for dynamic random-access memory (DRAM) but more than for flash memory.

As a non-volatile memory, 3D XPoint had a number of features that distinguish it from other currently available RAM and NVRAM. Although the first generations of 3D XPoint were not especially large or fast, 3D XPoint was used to create some of the fastest SSDs available as of 2019, with low write latency. As the memory was inherently fast and byte-addressable, techniques such as read-modify-write and caching used to enhance traditional SSDs are not needed to obtain high performance. Intel Optane Persistent Memory was designed for Intel Xeon Scalable Platform processors code-named Cascade Lake and could operate in Memory Mode, App Direct Mode, or Mixed Mode.

== History ==
=== Development ===
Development of 3D XPoint began around 2012. Intel and Micron had developed other non-volatile phase-change memory (PCM) technologies previously; (Note: Intel and Numonyx presented 64 Gbit stackable PCM chips in 2009.) Mark Durcan of Micron said that 3D XPoint architecture differs from previous offerings of PCM and uses chalcogenide materials for both selector and storage parts of the memory cell that are faster and more stable than traditional PCM materials like GST. But today, it is thought of as a subset of ReRAM. According to patents, a variety of materials can be used as the chalcogenide material.

3D XPoint has been stated to use electrical resistance and to be bit-addressable. Similarities to the resistive random-access memory under development by Crossbar Inc. have been noted, but 3D XPoint uses different storage physics. Specifically, transistors were replaced by threshold switches as selectors in the memory cells. 3D XPoint developers indicated that it was based on changes in resistance of the bulk material. Intel CEO Brian Krzanich responded to ongoing questions on the XPoint material that the switching was based on "bulk material properties". Intel has stated that 3D XPoint does not use a phase-change or memristor technology, although this is disputed by independent reviewers.

According to reverse engineering firm TechInsights, 3D XPoint used germanium–antimony–tellurium (GST) with low silicon content as the data storage material, which is accessed by ovonic threshold switches (OTSes) made of ternary-phased selenium–germanium–silicon with arsenic doping.

3D XPoint was the most widely produced standalone memory based on other than charge storage, whereas other alternative memories, like ReRAM or magnetoresistive RAM, have so far only been widely developed on embedded platforms.

=== Initial production ===
In mid-2015, Intel announced the Optane brand for storage products based on 3D XPoint technology. Micron (using the QuantX brand) estimated the memory to be sold for about half the price of dynamic random-access memory (DRAM), but four to five times the price of flash memory. Initially, a wafer fabrication facility in Lehi, Utah, operated by IM Flash Technologies LLC (an Intel–Micron joint venture) made small quantities of 128 Gbit chips in 2015. They stack two 64 Gbit planes. In early 2016 mass production of the chips was expected in 12 to 18 months.

In early 2016, IM Flash announced that the first generation of solid-state drives would achieve 95000 IOPS throughput with 9-microsecond latency. This low latency significantly increases IO rate at low queue depths for random operations. At Intel Developer Forum 2016, Intel demonstrated PCI Express (PCIe) 140 GB development boards showing 2.4–3× improvement in benchmarks compared to PCIe NAND flash solid-state drives (SSDs). On March 19, 2017, Intel announced their first product: a PCIe card available in the second half of 2017.

=== Reception ===
Optane 900p sequential mixed read–write performance, compared to a wide range of well reputed consumer SSDs. The graph shows how traditional SSD's performance drops sharply to around 500–700 MB/s for all but nearly pure read and write tasks, whereas the 3D XPoint device is unaffected and consistently produces around 2200–2400 MB/s throughput in the same test. Credit: Tom's Hardware.

Despite the initial lukewarm reception when first released, 3D XPoint – particularly in the form of Intel's Optane range – has been highly acclaimed and widely recommended for tasks where its specific features are of value, with reviewers such as Storage Review concluding in August 2018 that for low-latency workloads, 3D XPoint was producing sustained 500,000 IOPS for both 4K reads and writes, with 3–15-microsecond latencies, and that at present "there is currently nothing [else] that comes close", while Tom's Hardware described the Optane 900p in December 2017 as being like a "mythical creature" that must be seen to be believed, and which doubled the speed of the best previous consumer devices.

ServeTheHome concluded in 2017 that in read, write, and mixed tests, Optane SSDs were consistently around 2.5× as fast as the best Intel data-center SSDs that had preceded them, the P3700 NVMe. AnandTech noted that consumer Optane-based SSDs were similar in performance to the best non-3D-XPoint SSDs for large transfers, with both being "blown away" by the large-transfer performance of enterprise Optane SSDs.

=== Sale of Lehi fab, and discontinuation ===
On March 16, 2021, Micron announced that it would cease development of 3D XPoint in order to develop products based on Compute Express Link (CXL), due to a lack of demand. The Lehi fab was never fully utilized and was sold to Texas Instruments for US$900 million.

Intel responded at the time that its ability to supply Intel Optane products would not be affected. However, Intel had already discontinued its consumer line of Optane products in January 2021. In July 2022, Intel announced the winding down of the Optane division, effectively discontinuing the development of 3D XPoint.

== Compatibility ==
Intel makes Optane SSDs, Optane Memory, and combined ("Optane Memory with Solid-State Storage") devices. Micron only makes SSDs in the add-in card format, such as the QuantX X100.

=== As a standard SSD ===
Most Optane devices present themselves as an NVMe solid-state drive (SSD) to the computer. They may connect to the computer using an M.2 format, a U.2 format, or a PCI Express add-in card format. When Optane is used as an ordinary SSD (in any of these formats), its compatibility requirements are the same as for any traditional SSD. Therefore, compatibility depends only upon whether the hardware, operating system, and drivers can support NVMe and similar SSDs—the ability to be plugged into the hardware, operating system, BIOS/UEFI, and driver support for NVMe, and adequate cooling. Optane SSDs are therefore compatible with a wide range of older and newer chipsets and CPUs (including non-Intel chipsets and CPUs.)

=== As a cache for a slower drive ===
Intel markets a small subset of its Optane devices as "Intel Optane Memory", as opposed to the regular "Optane SSD". They too are attached via M.2 and are able to present themselves as an SSD. However, on supported combinations of Intel motherboards (with chipset and BIOS) and CPUs, these devices can also be used as a cache for a slower device.

According to Intel, Optane Memory operates in a mode with lower latency compared to Optane SSDs. Caching is performed by an extension of the Rapid Storage Technology driver, which automatically selects the more frequently used parts of another drive to be included in the cache.

(Some early Optane-branded SSDs are regular NAND devices with an Optane cache.)

=== As main memory ===
Intel marketed some "Optane SSDs" with "Intel Memory Drive Technology". These devices use regular PCIe (M.2, U.2, or PCIe AIC) interfaces but, besides presenting themselves as SSDs, are also able to present themselves as main memory given cooperation from the operating system. When used as memory, they are always used as if they are volatile memory; the main benefit is cost. Good performance can be expected for adding up to 8 times the system's real memory capacity, according to Intel's configuration guide. Earlier Optane SSDs can also be used this way after purchasing a separate license for the MDT software.

More unusual are the "Optane Persistent Memory" modules (2019) or Data Center Persistent Memory Modules (DCPMMs) that plug into regular DIMM slots, making them NVDIMMs. On supported motherboards, they are directly connected to the CPU's memory controller, like regular memory is. They can be used as if they were volatile memory or in a "persistent memory" mode where they operate like a very fast block device. Up to 512 GB is available as a single module. They are one order of magnitude higher latency than SDRAM, compared to the other Optane options, which have two orders of magnitude of latency difference.

== Using Optane SSDs for memory expansion or disk caching ==
Although Optane SSDs cannot be used directly by the motherboard and the CPU as extra memory or a disk cache, there have long been operating system mechanisms to use a disk as an expansion of the main memory (swap file) and to use a faster disk as a cache of a slower one (tiered storage). These software mechanisms are typically less performant than mechanisms written into a chipset's firmware, but the performance characteristics of Optane still render it more suitable than regular SSDs.

A 2023 paper in ACM ACCESS reports that a system with 4 GB of RAM and 16 GB of Optane SSD swap is more performant than the equivalent system built with a NAND SSD. The bottleneck in Optane SSD swap lies in the Linux block layer, which can be reduced by using zswap (a compressed in-RAM cache for swap). It was also more performant than a system with 8 GB of RAM, 4 GB of which is compressed with zram.

== See also ==
- Intel Turbo Memory
- NAND flash memory
- NOR flash memory
