= Grandis, Inc. =

Company producing magnetoresistive random-access memory

Grandis Inc.
- Type: Private
- Industry: Spin-Transfer Torque Random-Access Memory (STT MRAM)
- Founded: 2002
- Fate: Acquired by Samsung Electronics
- Headquarters: Milpitas, California
- Key people: Dr. Paul Nguyen (Founder) , Bill Almon (Co-founder) , Farhad Tabrizi (CEO)
- Products: General purpose and specialty thin-film memory and technology
- Number of employees: ~30
- Website: www.grandisinc.com

Grandis, Inc. was a California-based company founded in 2002 by Dr. Paul Nguyen and Bill Almon and backed by venture capital firms such as Sevin Rosen Funds and Matrix Partners to pioneer non-volatile solutions based on spintronics. The company developed thin-film memory and was considered a pioneer in developing spin-transfer torque random-access memory (STT-RAM).

Samsung Electronics acquired the company in August 2011.

== History ==
Grandis, Inc. was founded in Milpitas, CA in 2002 by Dr. Paul Nguyen, the company's first CEO and president, and Bill Almon, who later became CEO.

Farhad Tabrizi, an executive from Hynix joined in 2007 as CEO.

Grandis invented the first spin-transfer torque thin-film structures based on magnetic tunnel junctions and quickly became the leader in the STT-RAM space. In 2011, Grandis was acquired by Samsung Electronics Co., Ltd and merged into Samsung's memory operations.

== Products and technologies ==
Grandis supplies thin-film memory devices. The company is also a licensor of magnetoresistive random-access memory (MRAM) process and design technology to fabless semiconductor companies, wafer foundries, and integrated device manufacturers. Target applications include storage, telecommunications, mobile devices, and computer networking.

Grandis technology sought to address the problems of write selectivity and speed, low read signal, and thermal stability from which other products in the Magnetic Random-Access Memory (MRAM) industry suffered.

== Investors ==
Grandis's capital investors included Matrix Partners, Sevin Rosen Partners, and Applied Materials Ventures. The acquisition by Samsung resulted in a highly successful exit for Grandis's investors.
