= Driver (software) =

Programming interface

A driver in software provides a programming interface to control and manage specific lower-level interfaces that are often linked to a specific type of hardware, or other low-level service. In the case of hardware, the specific subclass of drivers controlling physical or virtual hardware devices are known as device drivers.

== Example ==
A client library for connecting to a database is often known as a driver, for example, the MySQL native driver for PHP.
