= A-RAM =

Advanced-Random Access Memory (RAM) is a type of dynamic random-access memory (DRAM) based on single-transistor capacitor-less cells. A-RAM was invented in 2009 at the University of Granada (UGR), in Spain, in collaboration with the Centre National de la Recherche Scientifique (CNRS), in France. It was conceived by Noel Rodriguez (UGR), Francisco Gamiz (UGR) and Sorin Cristoloveanu (CNRS). A-RAM is compatible with single-gate silicon on insulator (SOI), double-gate, FinFETs and multiple-gate field-effect transistors (MuFETs).

The conventional 1-transistor + 1-capacitor DRAM is extensively used in the semiconductor industry for manufacturing high-density dynamic memories. In 2009, the researchers thought that in manufacturing processes with features smaller than 45 nm, the DRAM industry would need to avoid the miniaturization issue of the memory-cell capacitor. The 1T-DRAM family of memories, including A-RAM, replaced the storage capacitor for the floating body of SOI transistors to store the charge.

The universities obtained at least one patent on the technology, and tried to license it in 2010. The University of Granada ran a web site promoting the technology, updated through 2010. A version called A2RAM was demonstrated in 2012.
