= Numonyx =

Swiss semiconductor company

- Company type: Joint venture
- Industry: Semiconductors
- Founded: March 31, 2008
- Defunct: February 9, 2010
- Fate: Acquired by Micron Technology
- Headquarters: Rolle, Switzerland
- Key people: Brian Harrison, CEO; Mario Licciardello, COO
- Revenue: ▲USD- million (2008)
- Number of employees: 6000-8000
- Parent: Micron Technology
- Website: www.Numonyx.com

Numonyx was a semiconductor company making flash memories, which was founded on March 31, 2008, by Intel Corporation, STMicroelectronics and Francisco Partners. It was acquired by Micron Technology on February 9, 2010, for US$1.27 billion.

Numonyx was created from the key assets of businesses that in 2006, generated approximately $3.6 billion in combined annual revenue. The company supplies non-volatile memory for a variety of consumer and industrial devices including cellular phones, MP3 players, digital cameras, computers and other high-tech equipment.

== Officers ==
Numonyx was managed by Brian Harrison, CEO of Numonyx and former vice president and general manager of Intel's Flash Memory Group, Mario Licciardello, COO of Numonyx and former corporate vice president and general manager of STMicroelectronics’ Flash Memories Group. Edward Doller, former CTO of Intel's memory group, was their Chief Technology Officer.

== Locations ==
Numonyx was headquartered in Rolle, Switzerland, and had sales, manufacturing and R&D facilities in the United States, Israel, Singapore, China and Italy.

== Products ==
Numonyx produced NOR and NAND flash memory, like the 2008 introduced M29EW NOR Flash memory chip, as well as phase-change memory brought over from Intel and STMicroelectronics memory businesses. While the company initially stopped selling 5-V flash memory, which at the time was often used in the automotive industry, the M29F 5-V line was announced in early 2009. In 2009, Numonyx had a NOR flash memory market share of 34.6 %, making them the largest vendor in the segment.
