= Crocus Technology =

Crocus Technology International Corporation
- Company type: Private
- Industry: Semiconductors
- Founded: 2004; 22 years ago
- Headquarters: Milpitas, California, USA
- Number of locations: Milpitas, California; Grenoble, France; Beijing, China
- Key people: Zack Deiri, (President & CEO) Ken Mc Kay, (VP Tech. Development); Jeff Childress, (CTO) Anuraag Mohan, (VP Applications)
- Products: Integrated magnetic sensors for industrial, automotive, and consumer applications.
- Owner: Independent (2004–23); Allegro MicroSystems (2023–present)
- Number of employees: ~75
- Website: crocus-technology.com

Crocus Technology, founded in 2004, was a venture-capital-backed semiconductor startup company developing and manufacturing integrated magnetic field sensors for a variety of applications: automotive, consumer goods, industrial and medical IoT.

== History ==
Crocus Technology was founded at Grenoble in 2004, based on research at the Spintec laboratory. It eventually moved its headquarters to Santa Clara, California, but retained its engineering base in Grenoble.

Later in its existence, the company focused its activities entirely on integrated, high-performance magnetic sensors. In 2022, it moved its California Headquarters from Santa Clara to Milpitas.

On October 31, 2023, Allegro MicroSystems completed the acquisition of the company for $420 million in cash.

== Products ==
The company initially developed its MLU™ (Magnetic Logic Unit™) technology for stand-alone and embedded spintronic MRAM. In 2015, Crocus Technology introduced its first magnetic sensor product based on its technology. The company further sold magnetic field sensors as well as sensors for flexible displays based on the technology.

Crocus offered magnetic switches, magnetic latches and angle sensors that are based on the TMR effect.

== Patents ==
In intellectual property, the company possesses 154 patents supporting its products, relating to TMR technology, memory and sensor design.

== Joint ventures ==
On June 18, 2009, Crocus Technology announced a partnership with an integrated circuit specialty foundry Tower Semiconductor. As part of the deal, both companies will dedicate special equipment to Tower's factory, and Tower will fully manufacture Crocus’ technology in its 200mm Fab2 facility. Tower took a $1.25 million equity position in Crocus.

== Investors ==
Other investors included Idinvest Partners, CDC Innovation, Enterprises et Patrimonies, Nano Dimension, Sofinnova Partners, Sofinnova Ventures, and Ventech.
