= Readable =

Readable may refer to:

- Readability
- Human-readable
- Reading (computer)
