= Saifun =

Saifun may refer to:

- Saifun Semiconductors, Ltd., an Israel-based semiconductor firm acquired by Spansion
- Saifun, the Taishanese pronunciation for cellophane noodles
