= Reading (computer) =

Action performed by computers

Reading is an action performed by computers, to acquire data from a source and place it into their volatile memory for processing. Computers may read information from a variety of sources, such as magnetic storage, the Internet, or audio and video input ports. Reading is one of the core functions of a Turing machine.

A read cycle is the act of reading one unit of information (e.g., a byte). A read channel is an electrical circuit that transforms the physical magnetic flux changes into abstract bits. A read error occurs when the physical part of the process fails for some reason, such as dust or dirt entering the drive.

== Example ==
For example, a computer may read information off a floppy disk and store it temporarily in random-access memory before it is written to the hard drive to be processed at a future date.

== Memory types ==
=== CMOS ===
Complementary metal–oxide–semiconductor (CMOS) is a non-volatile medium. It is used in microprocessors, microcontrollers, static RAM, and other digital logic circuits. Memory is read through the use of a combination of p-type and n-type metal–oxide–semiconductor field-effect transistors (MOSFETs). In CMOS logic, a collection of n-type MOSFETs are arranged in a pull-down network between the output node and the lower-voltage power supply rail, named V_{ss}, which often has ground potential. By asserting or de-asserting the inputs to the CMOS circuit, individual transistors along the pull-up and pull-down networks become conductive and resistive to electric current, and results in the desired path connecting from the output node to one of the voltage rails.

=== Flash ===
Flash memory stores information in an array of memory cells made from floating-gate transistors. Flash memory utilizes either NOR logic or NAND logic.

In NOR gate flash, each cell resembles a standard MOSFET, except the transistor has two gates instead of one. On top is the control gate (CG), as in other MOS transistors, but below this, there is a floating gate (FG) insulated all around by an oxide layer. The FG is interposed between the CG and the MOSFET channel, and because the FG is electrically isolated by its insulating layer, any electrons placed on it are trapped there and, under normal conditions, will not discharge for many years. When current flows through the MOSFET channel binary code is generated, reproducing the stored data.

NAND gate flash utilizes tunnel injection for writing and tunnel release for erasing. NAND flash memory forms the core of the removable USB storage devices known as USB flash drives, as well as most memory card formats available today.

=== Magnetic ===
The magnetic medium is found in magnetic tape, hard disk drives, floppy disks, and so on. This medium uses different patterns of magnetization in a magnetizable material to store data and is a form of non-volatile memory. Magnetic storage media can be classified as either sequential access memory or random-access memory.

Magnetic-core memory uses toroids (rings) of a hard magnetic material (usually a semi-hard ferrite) as transformer cores, where each wire threaded through the core serves as a transformer winding. Two or more wires pass through each core. Magnetic hysteresis allows each of the cores to store a state.

=== Mechanical ===
The mechanical medium utilizes one of the oldest methods of computing and has largely become obsolete. The earliest known method of memory storage and subsequent computerized reading is the Antikythera mechanism (c. 100–150 BCE) which utilizes over thirty gears that spin a dial indicator. Following the Antikythera mechanism, Hero of Alexandria (c. 10–70 CE) designed an entirely mechanical play almost ten minutes in length, powered by a binary-like system of ropes, knots, and simple machines operated by a rotating cylindrical cogwheel.

Punched cards were a common storage medium for computers from 1900 to 1950. The information was read through a method of identifying the holes in the card.

=== Optical discs ===
Optical discs refer to the non-volatile flat, circular, usually polycarbonate discs. Data is stored in pits or bumps arranged sequentially on the continuous, spiral track extending from the innermost track to the outermost track, covering the entire disc surface. Data is read by a means of a laser; when the laser enters a pit, the focus of the laser is changed and interpenetrated by the reader's software.

=== Random-access memory ===
Random-access memory (RAM) is a form of computer data storage. A random-access device allows stored data to be accessed directly in any random order. In contrast, other data storage media such as hard disks, CDs, DVDs and magnetic tape, as well as early primary memory types such as drum memory, read and write data only in a predetermined order, consecutively, because of mechanical design limitations. Therefore, the time to access a given data location varies significantly depending on its physical location. Today, random-access memory takes the form of integrated circuits. Strictly speaking, modern types of DRAM are not random access, as data is read in bursts, although the name DRAM / RAM has stuck. However, many types of SRAM, ROM, OTP, and NOR flash are still random access even in a strict sense. RAM is normally associated with volatile types of memory (such as DRAM memory modules), where its stored information is lost if the power is removed. Many other types of non-volatile memory are RAM as well, including most types of ROM and a type of flash memory called NOR-Flash. The first RAM modules to come into the market were created in 1951 and were sold until the late 1960s and early 1970s.

== See also ==
- Computer storage
- Optical character recognition
- Optical storage media writing and reading speed
- Turing machine
