= AXFS =

Compressed read-only file system

AXFS (Advanced XIP Filesystem) is a compressed read-only file system for Linux, initially developed at Intel, and now maintained at Numonyx. It was designed to use execute in place (XIP) alongside compression aiming to reduce boot and program load times, while retaining a small memory footprint for embedded devices. This is achieved by mixing compressed and uncompressed pages in the same executable file. AXFS is free software licensed under the GPL.

Cramfs is another read-only compressed file system that supports XIP (with patches); however, it uses a strategy of decompressing entire files, whereas AXFS supports XIP with page granularity. - this access strategy allows for near-ideal performance in typical (for embedded/compressed filesystems starting an operating system and applications) scenarios.

== See also ==
- Squashfs is another read-only compressed file system
- Cloop is a compressed loopback device module for the Linux kernel
- e2compr provides compression for ext2
- List of file systems
- Comparison of file systems
