= Tunnel injection =

Tunnel injection is a field electron emission effect; specifically a quantum process called Fowler–Nordheim tunneling, whereby charge carriers are injected into an electric conductor through a thin layer of an electric insulator.

It is used to program NAND flash memory. The process used for erasing is called tunnel release. This injection is achieved by creating a large voltage difference between the gate and the body of the MOSFET. When V_{GB} >> 0, electrons are injected into the floating gate. When V_{GB} << 0, electrons are forced out of the floating gate.

An alternative to tunnel injection is the spin injection.

== See also ==
- Hot carrier injection
