= Spansion =

American technology company

Spansion Inc.
- Industry: Semiconductors
- Founded: 2003
- Defunct: March 12, 2015; 11 years ago
- Fate: Purchased by Cypress Semiconductor
- Successor: Cypress Semiconductor, later acquired by Infineon
- Headquarters: Sunnyvale, California, United States
- Key people: John Kispert (CEO and Member of Spansion's Board of Directors)
- Products: Flash memory-based embedded systems
- Revenue: ~$1.3 billion USD (Annual 2013)
- Number of employees: ~3,700 (2014)
- Website: www.spansion.com

Spansion Inc. was an American-based company that designed, developed, and manufactured flash memory, microcontrollers, mixed-signal and analog products, and system-on-chip (SoC) solutions. The company had more than 3,700 employees in 2014 and was headquartered in Sunnyvale, California. It was founded as the joint-venture FASL between AMD and Fujitsu, which eventually was spun out into the independent company Spansion afterwards.

Spansion had more than 10,000 customers worldwide. Its products were used in the following markets: automotive electronics, home appliances, peripheral computing equipment, consumer equipment, industrial, and networking.

== History ==
Spansion, formerly known short as FASL LLC, was founded in 1993 in a joint venture between AMD and Japan's Fujitsu as Fujitsu AMD Semiconductor Limited. Once AMD took control of the company in 2003, it was renamed Spansion LLC in June 2004 and officially spun off as an independent maker of flash memory chips in December 2005.

After joining the company in 2009, CEO, John Kispert, brought Spansion out of bankruptcy with over $1 billion in sales and 10,000 customers worldwide. In 2013, Spansion purchased Fujitsu's microcontroller and analog business for $175 million, expanding Spansion's work force by more than 1,000 worldwide.

=== Mergers and acquisitions ===
In October 2007, Spansion announced that it was acquiring Israel-based Saifun Semiconductors Ltd., non-volatile memory provider. The companies signed an agreement that consolidated all MirrorBit and NROM IP, design and manufacturing expertise within Spansion. As a result, Spansion expanded its IP portfolio and enabled its immediate entry into the technology licensing business. The acquisition closed on March 18, 2008.

In April 2013, Spansion announced that it would acquire the Microcontroller and Analog Business of Fujitsu Semiconductor Limited for approximately $110 million and approximately $65 million for inventory. Spansion closed the acquisition deal in August 2013.

In December 2014, Cypress Semiconductor merged with Spansion in an all-stock deal worth $1.59 billion. Shareholders of each side will own about 50 percent of the new company, which will keep the name of Cypress Semiconductor Corp. The companies valued the deal at $4 billion. They expected it to close in the first half of 2015 and to cut annual costs by $135 million within three years. Cypress President and CEO TJ Rodgers was the CEO of the combined company, which was expected to have $2 billion in annual revenue. Spansion Chairman Ray Bingham was the non-executive chairman.

== Products ==
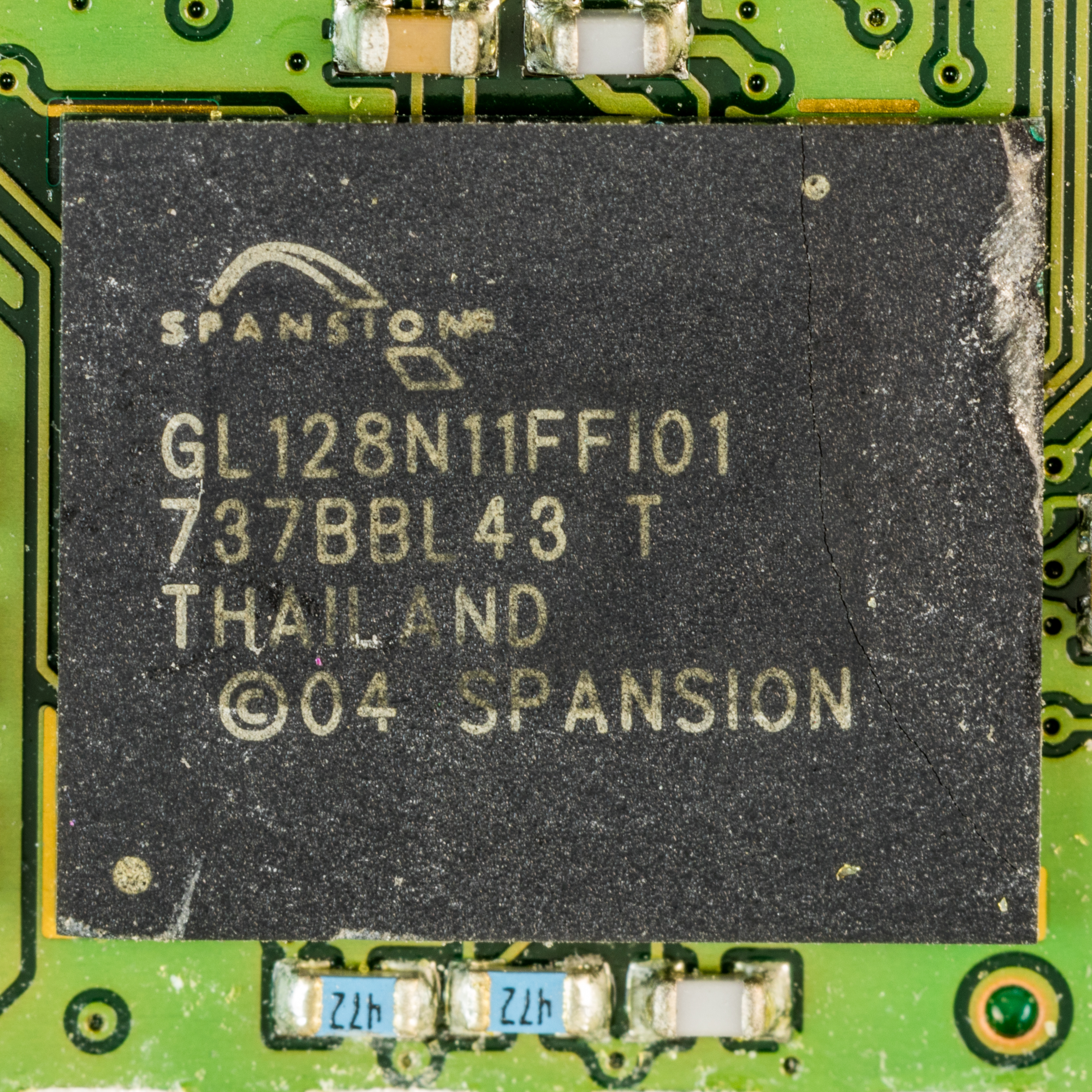
A Spansion 128 Megabit Flash Memory with 110 nm MirrorBit Process Technology

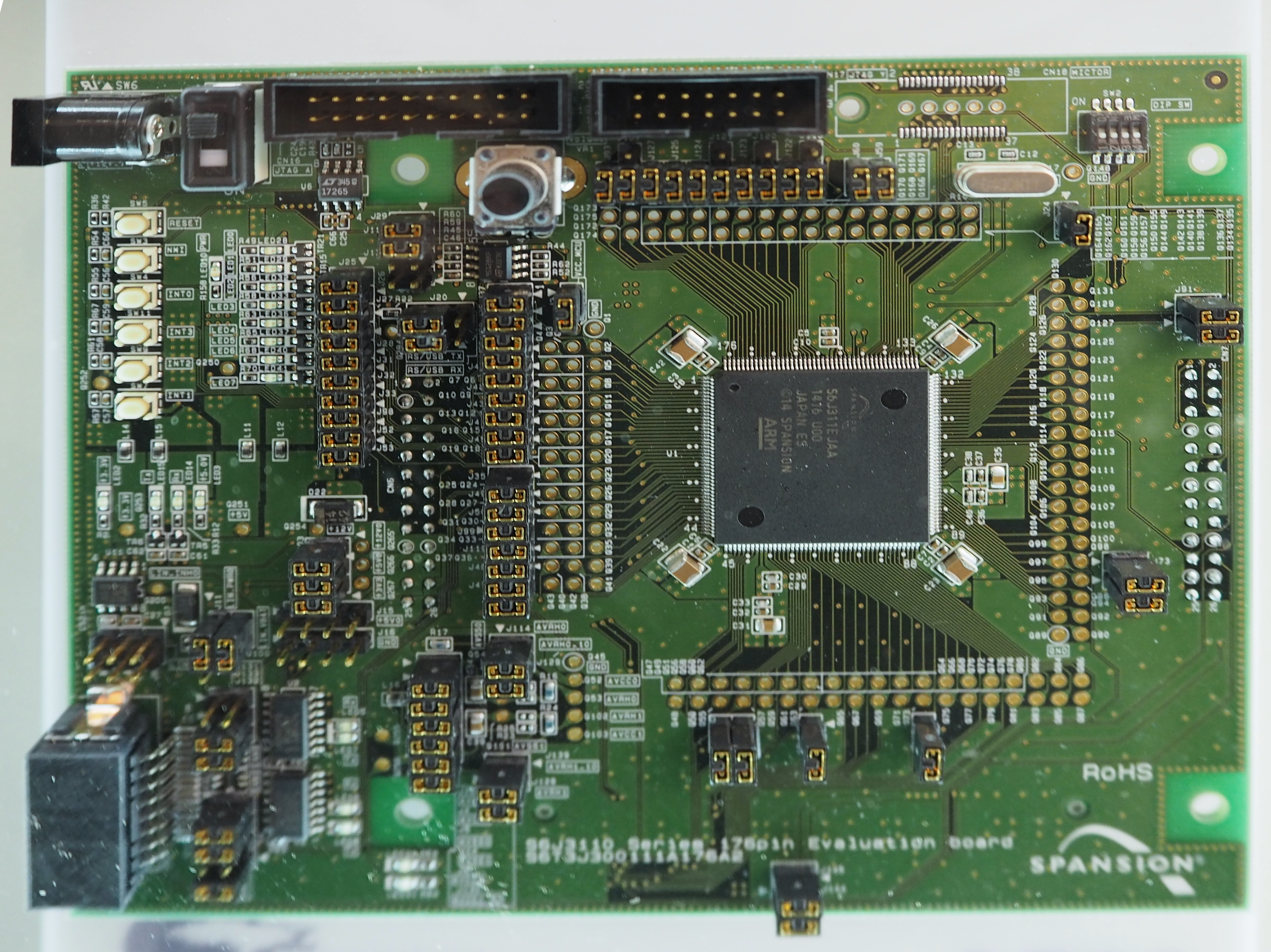
Spansion Traveo ARM-.Evaluation-Board

Spansion's product portfolio offers NOR densities ranging from four-megabit to eight-gigabits, NAND densities ranging from one-gigabit to eight-gigabits and an array of interfaces and features. It has developed two flash memory technologies, single-bit-per-cell floating gate technology and one-, two- or more-bit-per-cell MirrorBit technology, with MirrorBit products based on two-bits per cell and allowing offering a range of product configurations. The Company's products based on NOR flash memory architecture are designed for code storage and execution, and utilize either traditional floating gate technology or its MirrorBit technology.

Spansion's NOR and NAND offering was targeted at embedded applications such as automotive, industrial and telecommunications.

Spansion concentrated on the embedded electronics market. Its Floating Gate and MirrorBit technology was used to make networking and telecommunications equipment, consumer electronics, gaming equipment, TV set-top control boxes, automotive equipment and personal computer peripherals.

The company's NOR products offer designers the option to choose from 5V, 3V and 1.8V products that range from 1Mb to 2Gb.NAND products offer 3V and 1.8V products that range from 1Gb to 8 Gb.

Spansion's standard parallel NOR flash includes Spansion's MirrorBit NOR GL, AL AS, CD-CL, F, JL, PL, NS/VS/XS and WS families of flash memory. The products operate anywhere at 1.8 to 5.0 volts (Vcc), feature a random read speed of 90-100 nanoseconds (ns) access and offer a page read speed of 25 ns via an 8-word page buffer.

Spansion's serial peripheral interface (SPI) devices read information serially, or one bit at a time, requiring fewer connections and pins, allowing for lower costs and simplified board layouts. Serial flash memory is used in applications such as high-end printers, FPGAs, networking equipment and set-top boxes.

The Spansion SPI FL family of serial flash memory: Densities for the SPI flash memory devices range from 4 Mb to 1 Gb with uniform 4KB uniform 64KB and uniform 256KB (128Mb – 1Gb FL-S) sectors and 4 Mb with parameter sectors.

Spansion developed the HyperFlash NOR memory devices, based on the HyperBus interface. The family features read throughput of up to 333 megabytes per second—more than five times faster than ordinary Quad SPI flash currently available with one-third the number of pins of parallel NOR flash. Spansion HyperFlash memory devices provide a migration path—from single Quad SPI to Dual Quad SPI to HyperFlash Memory—allowing system applications to be scaled to different levels of flash performance when paired with compatible controllers, giving OEMs the ability to offer different product models with a single design.

In August 2011, Spansion announced that it had created the first single-die, 4-gigabit NOR product implemented at the 65-nm node.

In 2013 Spansion acquired the Fujitsu microcontroller and analog business, including 8- 16- and 32-bit microcontroller families.

Spansion's FM MCU microcontroller family, which was based on the ARM Cortex-M4, M3, M0+ CPUs comes in packages from 32 to 216 pins, with flash memory densities between 56KB and 2MB. The Spansion Traveo microcontrollers are based on the ARM Cortex-R5 core and the first series in the Traveo family, MB9D560, operate at 200 MHz.

Spansion also acquired power management ICs aimed at energy harvesting and LED lighting. The Buck PMIC for solar and vibrations energy harvesting MB39C811regulates output voltage with the quiescent current of 1.5 μA. The Boost PMIC for solar and thermal energy harvesting MB39C831. Spansion's Easy DesignSim was a comprehensive online design support tool for LED Driver Circuit designers.

== Manufacturing ==
Spansion had its headquarters in Sunnyvale, California. The company's main wafer fabrication facility, known as Fab 25, was in Austin, Texas. The company also operated a final-manufacturing facility, in Bangkok, Thailand. In Penang, Malaysia, the company had a design center to focus on providing design, layout, CAD and verification services and to support to cross-site design centers.

== Financial ==
At the end of Q2 2014, Spansion reported results for its second fiscal quarter; the company reported both GAAP and non-GAAP results due to the impact of fresh start accounting. On a U.S. GAAP basis, Spansion reported net sales of $314.7 million, a 61.3% year-over-year increase. On a non‑GAAP basis, gross margin was 33.2%, operating income was $22.1 million and net income was $15.6 million.

=== Emergence from Chapter 11 ===
After filing a motion with the U.S. Bankruptcy Court for the District of Delaware, in April 2010, Spansion won court approval of its plan to exit bankruptcy and was allowed to reorganize the company.

On May 10, 2010, Spansion emerged from Chapter 11 bankruptcy. Its old common stock was previously deemed to be impaired and then cancelled; the company issued new shares to those to whom it owed money. The company began trading on the New York Stock Exchange on June 22, 2010 under the ticker symbol "CODE."

=== Executive pay controversy ===
John Kispert was named CEO in February 2009, a month before the company's Chapter 11 filing. It was understood that Kispert walked into a "no-win situation," according to the local media.

With the company in turmoil and needing to reduce expenses, Spansion laid off 3,000 employees without severance pay on February 23, 2009. Kispert was given a compensation package that could pay a $1.7 million bonus if he successfully found a buyer for the company or liquidated the company within six months. Kispert never saw this bonus since he opted to file bankruptcy in March 2009. Managers received an 11% increase in pay, negating the effect of an earlier 10% salary cut. The company filed for Chapter 11 bankruptcy on March 1, 2009.

In 2010, a settlement was reached on behalf of former employees of Spansion Inc. whose employment was terminated on or around February 23, 2009. Kispert also instituted a policy of offering any new jobs first to the employees who were fired in 2009.
