= Rambus Inc. v. Nvidia =

Rambus Inc. v. Nvidia Corporation
- Court: United States District Court for the Northern District of California
- Decided: July 26, 2010
- Citations: C 08-3343 SI;C 08-5500 SI

Holding
- ITC ruled Nvidia has violated three patents belonging to Rambus

Court membership
- Judge sitting: Susan Illston

Keywords
- Intellectual Property, Patent

Rambus Inc. v. Nvidia Corporation was a patent infringement case between Rambus and Nvidia. The case was heard in the United States District Court for the Northern District of California.

Rambus Inc, founded in 1990, is an American technology company that designs, develops and licenses chip interface technologies and architectures that are used in digital electronics products. The company is well known for inventing RDRAM® and for its intellectual property-based litigation following the introduction of DDR-SDRAM memory. Nvidia, founded in 1993, is an American technology company that manufactures, distributes and designs graphics processing units (GPUs) for the gaming and professional markets, as well as system on a chip units (SoCs) for the mobile computing and automotive market.

In 2008, Rambus Inc, initially filed a complaint accusing Nvidia of infringing seventeen Rambus patents. Rambus licenses patents covering technologies that it invents and develops to companies such as Microsoft, Intel, Nintendo and Creative Labs. Since its founding in 1990, Rambus has been awarded, by the United States Patent and Trademark Office, over 1,000 patents on many of the components that make up memory controllers and modern computer processor chips.

In this case, starting in July 2008, Rambus argued that Nvidia's units infringed its patents on SDR, DDR, DDR2, DDR3, GDDR and GDDR3 technologies, to name a few. Rambus sought a preliminary injunction and compensation for damages under 35 U.S.C. § 284 in addition to an adjudication that Nvidia has infringed and continues to infringe the Rambus patents. Early on, Rambus dropped two of the seventeen patent infringement claims due to covenant dealings. Nvidia moved for a stay on the remaining fifteen patents pursuant to 28 U.S.C. § 1659. Judge Susan Illston ordered for a stay on nine patents, pending a ruling from the International Trade Commission (ITC) in which Rambus was filing similar patent infringement suits against Nvidia as well as other related chip and memory manufacturing companies. The request to stay on the remaining six patents was denied. Later on it was settled that the nine patents presented in another ITC case were unenforceable in the case of Micron v. Rambus. In July, 2010, ITC ruled that Nvidia violated three patents belonging to Rambus. Nvidia soon signed a license with Rambus while appealing the ITC ruling.

== Background ==
Rambus Inc. develops new chip technologies, obtains patents for these technologies and subsequently sells licenses on these patents to companies in the memory chip and video card business, such as Intel and Micron Inc. In the past year, 96% of its revenue came from licenses. Rambus licenses its technologies to customers who take these technologies and further develop them and integrate them into systems that are sold to consumers. Examples of such systems are the PS3, laptops, and netbooks. The technologies include memory controllers, memory components, memory modules, and memory systems. Nvidia sells GPUs and has been doing so since 1990. Rambus filed a complaint that Nvidia's use of chip technology infringed on several patents that Rambus holds.

The complaint, filed on July 10, 2008, charged Nvidia with infringing seventeen Rambus patents, though two of these claims were dropped. The fifteen patents considered in this case fall into one of two groups: those filed by Michael Farmwald and Mark Horowitz, the founders of Rambus (described in the case as the six 'FH' patents), and nine patents claiming technology invented by Richard Barth and/or Frederick Ware, (the "Barth/Ware" patents). The complaint alleges, for each of the patents-insuit, that Nvidia has directly infringed the patents "and/or has contributed and continues to contribute to the literal infringement and/or infringement under the doctrine of equivalents . . . and/or has actively induced and continues to actively induce others to infringe [the patents-in-suit]." Rambus sought monetary and injunctive relief, including treble damages and attorneys' fees due to defendant's willful infringement and the "exceptional nature of this case."

The day after Rambus filed the patent lawsuit, Nvidia filed an antitrust lawsuit against Rambus in the middle District of North Carolina. In December, 2008, the North Carolina court transferred Nvidia's antitrust action to United States District Court for the Northern District of California on the grounds that Nvidia's antitrust claims properly belonged as counterclaims to Rambus's patent infringement claims in this case. District Court for the Northern District of California ordered consolidation of the two cases.

On November 6, 2008, Rambus filed a complaint against Nvidia in the United States International Trade Commission alleging infringement of the nine Barth/Ware patents. On December 4, 2008, Nvidia moved to stay litigation on all of Rambus' infringement claims, on the ground that the ITC proceeding automatically stayed litigation on the Barth/Ware patents pursuant to 28 U.S.C. 1659, and that, among other things, the FH patents involved many of the same products involved in the ITC proceedings.

== Procedural history ==
On November 13, 2008, the court denied the defendant's motion to strike and to dismiss. Rambus was required to provide additional factual information and legal contentions pursuant to the Local Patent Rules and discovery.

On March 11, 2009, Nvidia filed a motion to dismiss and a motion for partial summary judgment, the court found it premature to rule on the case, their decision having been bound in preclusion due to the ITC case. The court therefore directed the parties to discuss the propriety of a stay of all proceedings in all the consolidated cases pending the Federal Circuit's resolution of the enforceability of Rambus' patents in Micron and Hynix I. Nvidia's both motions seek issue preclusion based on Judge Robinson's ruling in Micron Tech., Inc. v. Rambus, Inc., 255 F.R.D.135(D. Del. 2009), that Rambus spoliated evidence and had a reputation of destroying relevant documents as part of its patent litigation strategy. Judge Robinson held that Rambus' patents were unenforceable as a sanction for spoliation of documents. Nvidia contends that issue preclusion is appropriate because FH patents are from the same patent family as the patents litigated in Judge Robinson's case. Nvidia also argued issue preclusion also applies to the Barth/Ware patents because Rambus had a policy of regularly destroying documents related to any patent prosecution.

However, the Court found it premature to rule on the preclusive effect of either Judge Robinson's or Judge Whyte's decisions, and that a stay of all proceedings would be appropriate. The patents in suit are related to the Rambus patents held unenforceable by Judge Robinson in Micron. The Federal Circuit's resolution of Judge Robinson's decision in Micron and Judge Whyte's conflicting decision in Hynix I will be relevant – and potentially dispositive – to these proceedings. The court believes "A stay will thus promote judicial economy and conserve the parties' and the judiciary's resources. In addition, the harm resulting from a stay will be minimal".

On June 8, 2009, Nvidia announced that Rambus had asked an administrative law judge at the International Trade Commission (ITC) to terminate the investigation of Nvidia relating to four patents stemming from a complaint filed in November 2008 because they "conceded that Nvidia products do not infringe on its four patents before the ITC".

On January 22, 2010, U.S. International Trade Commission judge ruled in an initial determination that Nvidia has violated three patents belonging to Rambus. ITC also cleared Nvidia from two other patents infringement. Due to this ruling Nvidia is facing a US import ban on some of its chips. The chips facing the US import ban are used in the nForce, Quadro, GeForce, Tesla and Tegra series graphics products, nearly every video card type manufactured by Nvidia. However, David Shannon, executive of Nvidia dismissed Rambus's victory on the other three patents because they will continue to be subject to reexamination proceedings in the US Patent and Trademark Office (PTO). He claimed that the US PTO has consistently found Rambus's asserted claims invalid.

On January 27, 2010, the court ordered the parties to address on the impact of these consolidated cases of the January 22, 2010 ruling by the International Trade Commission, as well as the status of any further proceedings in the ITC and the U.S. Patent and Trademark Office at the March 12, 2010 case management conference.

On July 26, 2010, U.S. International Trade Commission ruled Nvidia chips infringed three Rambus patents, and issued an order that would ban imports of certain products containing the chips. Nvidia said it can continue sales by taking advantage of a licensing arrangement Rambus reached with European regulators as part of an unrelated antitrust case.

January 24, 2012 - The last of three patents that tech licensing company Rambus used to win infringement lawsuits against Nvidia Corp has been declared invalid. The three patents - collectively known as the Barth patents - pertain to memory chips used in personal computers and are considered to be among Rambus' most valuable intellectual property.

On June 28, 2013 the invalidity contentions of the Barth patents were reversed by the Court of Appeals of the Federal Circuit:

In conclusion, the Board’s determination that all 25 claims of the ’109 Patent are invalid as anticipated by Farmwald is not supported by substantial evidence. Accordingly, this court reverses.
