= Rambus =

American technology company

Rambus Inc.
- Type: Public
- Traded as: Nasdaq: RMBS; S&P 400 component
- Industry: Semiconductors
- Founded: March 1990; 36 years ago
- Founders: Mark Horowitz; Mike Farmwald
- Headquarters: San Jose, California, U.S.
- Key people: Luc Seraphin (CEO)
- Revenue: ▲US$461 million (2023)
- Operating income: ▲US$154 million (2023)
- Net income: ▲US$334 million (2023)
- Total assets: ▲US$1.26 billion (2023)
- Total equity: ▲US$1.04 billion (2023)
- Number of employees: 623 (2023)
- Subsidiaries: Cryptography Research
- Website: rambus.com

Rambus Inc. is an American technology company that designs, develops and licenses chip interface technologies and architectures that are used in digital electronics products. The company, founded in 1990, is well known for inventing RDRAM and for its intellectual property-based litigation following the introduction of DDR-SDRAM memory.

== History ==
Rambus was founded in March 1990 by electrical and computer engineers, Mike Farmwald and Mark Horowitz. The company's early investors included premier venture capital and investment banking firms such as Kleiner Perkins Caufield and Byers, Merrill Lynch, Mohr Davidow Ventures, and Goldman Sachs.

Rambus was incorporated and founded as a California company in 1990 and then re-incorporated in the state of Delaware before the company went public in 1997 on the NASDAQ stock exchange under the symbol RMBS.

In the 1990s, Rambus was a high-speed interface technology development and marketing company that invented 600 MHz interface technology, which solved memory bottleneck issues faced by system designers. Rambus's technology was based on a very high speed, chip-to-chip interface that was incorporated on dynamic random-access-memory (DRAM) components, processors and controllers, which achieved performance rates over ten times faster than conventional DRAMs. Rambus's RDRAM transferred data at 600 MHz over a narrow byte-wide Rambus Channel to Rambus-compatible Integrated Circuits (ICs).

Described as a packet-oriented bus, said to be based on the system bus of the MIPS RC6280 server and developed by "key participants in the design" of that system, Rambus replaced the multiplexed addresses and control signals of conventional RAM by information in packets transmitted over a data channel. The bus as implemented by Toshiba for 4 Mbit dynamic RAM in 1993 ran at 250 MHz.

Rambus's interface was an open standard, accessible to all semiconductor companies, such as Intel. Rambus provided companies who licensed its technology a full range of reference designs and engineering services. Rambus's interface technology was broadly licensed to leading DRAM, ASIC and PC peripheral chipset suppliers in the 1990s. Licensees of Rambus's RDRAM technology included companies such as Creative Labs, Intel, Microsoft, Nintendo, Silicon Graphics, Hitachi, Hyundai, IBM, Molex, Macronix and NEC.

Rambus RDRAM technology was integrated into products such as Nintendo 64, Intel's system memory chipsets for PCs, Creative Labs Graphics Blaster 3D Graphics cards for PCs, workstations manufactured by Silicon Graphics and Microsoft's prototype Talisman 3D graphics chip set.

In 2003, Rambus Incorporated announced that Toshiba Corp. and Elpida Memory Inc. will produce its new memory technology, known as XDR DRAM. The memory technology is capable of running at 3.2 GHz and is said to be faster than any memory technology available in consumer entertainment devices and PCs at the time.

Rambus purchased Cryptography Research on June 6, 2011, for $342.5M. This will enable Rambus Inc. to develop its semiconductor licensing portfolio to include CRI's content protection and security. According to Rambus CEO Harold Hughes, the CRI security technologies would be applied to a variety of products in the company's IP portfolio.

Rambus derives the majority of its annual revenue by licensing its technologies and patents for chip interfaces to its customers. According to The Wall Street Journal, history of Rambus has been "marked by litigation, including patent battles with numerous chip makers".

In 2015, Rambus acquired Integrion Microelectronics, a small Toronto-based IP provider of high-speed analog SerDes PHY for an undisclosed amount. Through this acquisition, Rambus opened its first Canadian office and boosted its high-speed serdes IP portfolio offering. On August 17, 2015, Rambus announced the new R+ DDR4 server memory chips RB26 DDR4 RDIMM and RB26 DDR4 LRDIMM. The chipset includes a DDR4 Register Clock Driver and Data Buffer, and it is fully compliant with the JEDEC DDR4.

In 2016, Rambus acquired Semtech's Snowbush IP for US$32.5 million. Snowbush IP provides analog and mixed-signal IP technologies, and will expand Rambus' product offerings. In 2016, Rambus acquired Inphi Memory Interconnect Business, for US$90 million. The acquisition includes all assets of the Inphi Memory Interconnect Business, such as customer contracts, product inventory, supply chain agreements, and intellectual property. On November 2, 2017, Rambus announced partnership with Interac Association and Samsung Canada to assist in enabling Samsung Pay in Canada.

In 2018, Rambus agreed to renew a patent license with Nvidia. Rambus would be sharing its patent portfolio, including those covering serial links and memory controllers, with Nvidia. On December 11, 2019, Rambus HBM2 PHY and Memory Controller IP were announced to be used in Inflame Technology's AI training chip. In 2019, Rambus announced that it will move headquarters from Sunnyvale, California to North San Jose, California.

In 2021, Rambus announced that it started an expedited share buyback program with Deutsche Bank to buy up roughly $100 million in common stock. Rambus also acquired two companies, AnalogX and PLDA, which specialize in physical links for PCIe and CXL protocols. In May 2022, it was announced Rambus had acquired the Montreal-headquartered electronic design company, Hardent. In July 2023, Rambus sold its SerDes and memory interface PHY IP business to Cadence Design Systems for $110 million. In September 2023, it was announced the acquisition had been completed.

== Technology ==
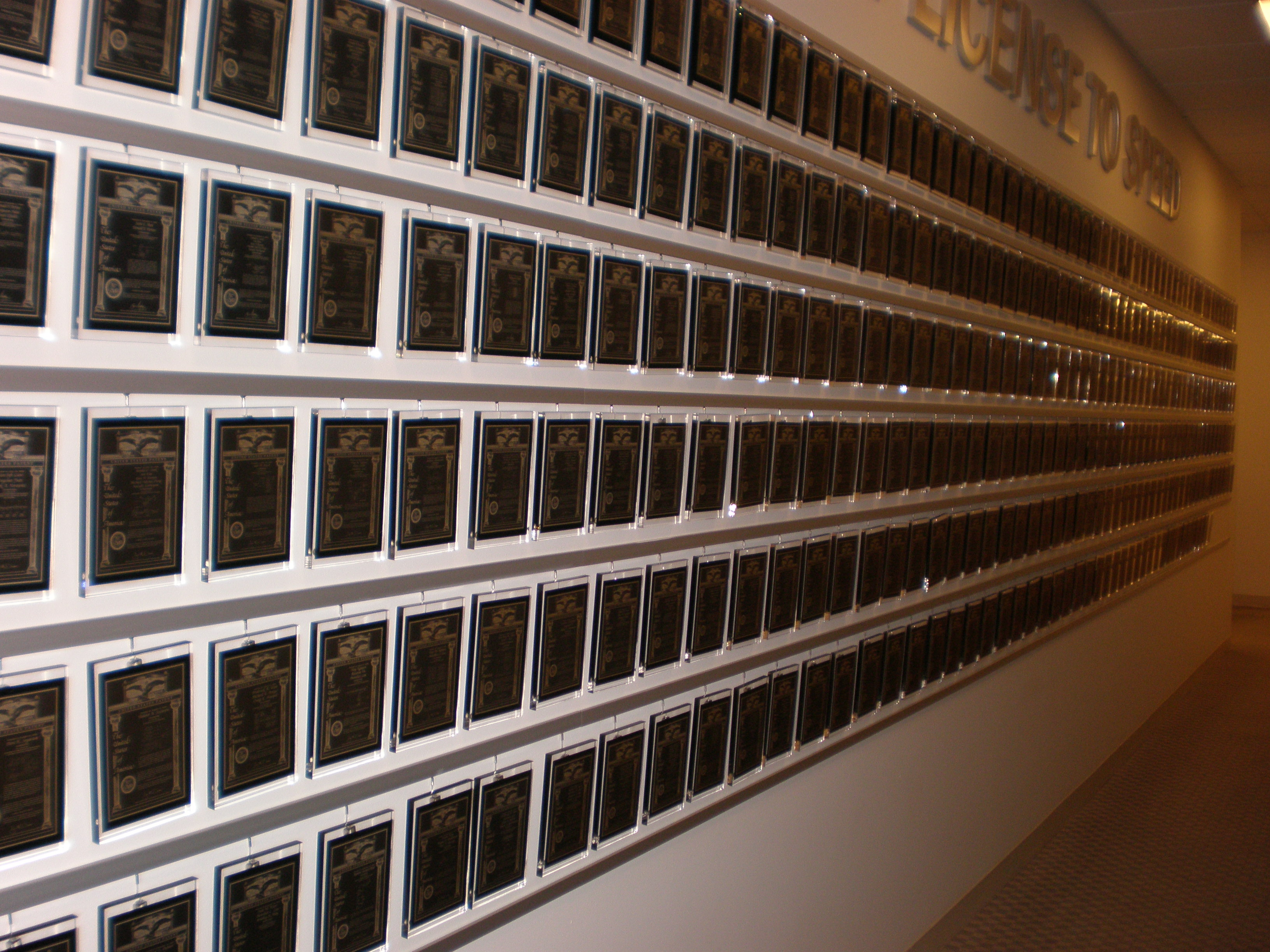
Plaques on a wall at the Rambus headquarters then in Los Altos in 2009 with the caption "License to Speed", each representing a U.S. patent issued to the company.

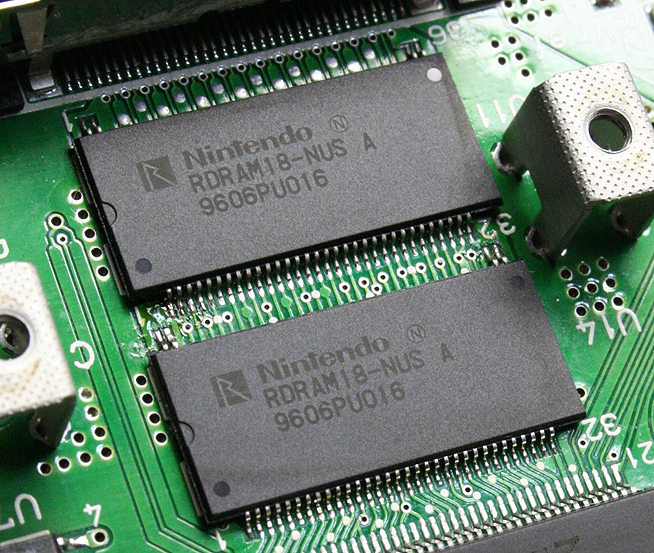
RDRAM18-NUS on Nintendo 64

An early version of RDRAM, base RDRAM, was used in the Nintendo 64 that was released in 1996.

Disadvantages of RDRAM technology include significantly increased latency, power dissipation as heat, manufacturing complexity, and cost. PC800 RDRAM operated with a minimum latency of 45 ns, compared to 15 ns for PC133 SDRAM. RDRAMs can also be told to increase their latencies in order to prevent the possibility of two or more chips transmitting at the same time and causing a collision. However, SDRAM latency depends on the current state of memory so its latency can vary widely depending on what happened earlier and the strategy used by the SDRAM controller, while RDRAM latency is constant once it has been established by the memory controller. RDRAM memory chips also put out significantly more heat than SDRAM chips, necessitating heat sinks on all RIMM devices.

Rambus also developed and licensed its XDR DRAM technology, notably used in the PlayStation 3, and more recently XDR2 DRAM.

== Lawsuits ==
In the early 1990s, Rambus was invited to join the JEDEC. Rambus had been trying to interest memory manufacturers in licensing its proprietary memory interface, and numerous companies had signed non-disclosure agreements to view Rambus' technical data. During the later Infineon v. Rambus trial, Infineon memos from a meeting with representatives of other manufacturers surfaced, including the line "[O]ne day all computers will be built this way, but hopefully without the royalties going to Rambus", and continuing with a strategy discussion for reducing or eliminating royalties to be paid to Rambus. As Rambus continued its participation in JEDEC, it became apparent that they were not prepared to agree to JEDEC's patent policy requiring owners of patents included in a standard to agree to license that technology under terms that are "reasonable and non-discriminatory", and Rambus withdrew from the organization in 1995. Memos from Rambus at that time showed it was tailoring new patent applications to cover features of SDRAM being discussed, which were public knowledge (JEDEC meetings are not secret) and perfectly legal for patent owners who have patented underlying innovations, but were seen as evidence of bad faith by the jury in the first Infineon v. Rambus trial. The Court of Appeals for the Federal Circuit (CAFC) rejected this theory of bad faith in its decision overturning the fraud conviction Infineon achieved in the first trial (see below).

=== Patent lawsuits ===
In 2000, Rambus began filing lawsuits against the largest memory manufacturers, claiming that it owned SDRAM and DDR technology. Seven manufacturers, including Samsung, quickly settled with Rambus and agreed to pay royalties on SDRAM and DDR memory. In May 2001, Rambus was found guilty of fraud for having claimed that it owned SDRAM and DDR technology, and all infringement claims against memory manufacturers were dismissed. In January 2003, the CAFC overturned the fraud verdict of the jury trial in Virginia under Judge Payne, issued a new claims construction, and remanded the case back to Virginia for re-trial on infringement. In October 2003, the U.S. Supreme Court refused to hear the case. Thus, the case returned to Virginia per the CAFC ruling.

In January 2005, Rambus filed four more lawsuits against memory chip makers Hynix Semiconductor, Nanya Technology, Inotera Memories and Infineon Technology claiming that DDR2, GDDR2 and GDDR3 chips contain Rambus technology. In March 2005, when Rambus was accused of shredding key documents prior to court hearings, the judge agreed and dismissed Rambus's case against Infineon. This led Rambus to negotiate a settlement with Infineon, which agreed to pay Rambus quarterly license fees of $5.9 million and in return, both companies ceased all litigation against each other. The agreement ran from November 2005 to November 2007. After this date, if Rambus had enough remaining agreements in place, Infineon could make extra payments up to $100 million. In June 2005, Rambus also sued one of its strongest proponents, Samsung, the world's largest memory manufacturer, and terminated Samsung's license. Samsung had promoted Rambus's RDRAM and currently remains a licensee of Rambus's XDR memory.

In February 2006, Micron Technology sued Rambus, alleging that Rambus had violated RICO and deliberately harmed Micron. On April 29, 2008, the Court of Appeals for the Federal Circuit issued a ruling vacating the order of the U.S. District Court for the Eastern District of Virginia, saying the case with Samsung should be dismissed, saying Judge Robert E. Payne's findings critical of Rambus, were on a case that had already been settled, and thus had no legal standing.

On January 9, 2009, a Delaware federal judge ruled that Rambus could not enforce patents against Micron Technology Inc., stating that Rambus had a "clear and convincing" show of bad faith, and ruled that Rambus' destruction of key related documents (spoliation of evidence) nullified its right to enforce its patents against Micron. In July 2009, the United States Patent and Trademark Office (USPTO) rejected 8 claims by Rambus against Nvidia. On November 24, 2009, the USPTO rejected all 17 claims in three Rambus patents that the company asserted against Nvidia in a complaint filed with the U.S. International Trade Commission (ITC). However the ITC announced that out of five patents, Nvidia did violate three of them. Due to this ruling Nvidia faced a potential U.S. import ban on some of its chips used in the nForce, Quadro, GeForce, Tesla, and Tegra series graphics products—nearly every video card type manufactured by Nvidia.

On June 20, 2011, Rambus went to trial against Micron and Hynix in California, seeking as much as $12.9 billion in damages for "a secret and unlawful conspiracy to kill a revolutionary technology, make billions of dollars and hang onto power", Rambus lawyer Bart Williams told jurors. Rambus lost on November 16, 2011, when the San Francisco County Superior Court jury ruled against Rambus in a 9–3 vote, and its shares dropped drastically, from $14.04 to $4.00 per share.

On January 24, 2012, a USPTO appeals board declared the third of three patents known as the "Barth patents" invalid. The first two had been declared invalid in September 2011. Rambus had used these patents to win infringement lawsuits against Nvidia Corp and Hewlett-Packard. However, on June 28, 2013, The Court of Appeals for the Federal Circuit reversed the USPTO and the '109 Barth patent's validity was reinstated: "In conclusion, the Board's determination that all 25 claims of the '109 Patent are invalid as anticipated by Farmwald is not supported by substantial evidence. Accordingly, this court reverses."

=== Federal Trade Commission antitrust suits ===
In May 2002, the United States Federal Trade Commission (FTC) filed charges against Rambus for antitrust violations. Specifically, the FTC complaint asserted that through the use of patent continuations and divisionals, Rambus pursued a strategy of expanding the scope of its patent claims to encompass the emerging SDRAM standard. The FTC's antitrust allegations against Rambus went to trial in the summer of 2003 after the organization formally accused Rambus of anti-competitive behavior the previous June, itself the result of an investigation launched in May 2002 at the behest of the memory manufacturers. The FTC's chief administrative-law judge, Stephen J. McGuire, dismissed the antitrust claims against Rambus in 2006, saying that the memory industry had no reasonable alternatives to Rambus technology and was aware of the potential scope of Rambus patent rights, according to the company. Soon after, FTC investigators filed a brief to appeal against that ruling.

On August 2, 2006, the FTC overturned McGuire's ruling, stating that Rambus illegally monopolized the memory industry under section 2 of the Sherman Antitrust Act, and also practiced deception that violated section 5 of the Federal Trade Commission Act.

February 5, 2007, the FTC issued a ruling that limits maximum royalties that Rambus may demand from manufacturers of dynamic random-access memory (DRAM), which was set to 0.5% for DDR SDRAM for 3 years from the date the commission's Order is issued and then going to 0; while SDRAM's maximum royalty was set to 0.25%. The Commission claimed that halving the DDR SDRAM rate for SDRAM would reflect the fact that while DDR SDRAM utilizes four of the relevant Rambus technologies, SDRAM uses only two. In addition to collecting fees for DRAM chips, Rambus will also be able to receive 0.5% and 1.0% royalties for SDRAM and DDR SDRAM memory controllers or other non-memory chip components respectively. However, the ruling did not prohibit Rambus from collecting royalties on products based on DDR2 SDRAM, GDDR2, and other JEDEC post-DDR memory standards. Rambus has appealed the FTC Opinion/Remedy and awaits a court date for the appeal.

On March 26, 2008, the jury of the U.S. District Court for the Northern District of California determined that had Rambus acted properly while a member of the standard-setting organization JEDEC during its participating in the early 1990s, finding that the memory manufacturers did not meet their burden of proving antitrust and fraud claims. On April 22, 2008, the U.S. Court of Appeals for the D.C. Circuit overturned the FTC reversal of McGuire's 2006 ruling, saying that the FTC had not established that Rambus had harmed the competition. On February 23, 2009, the U.S. Supreme Court rejected the bids by the FTC to impose royalty sanctions on Rambus via antitrust penalties.

=== European Commission antitrust suit ===
July 30, 2007, the European Commission launched antitrust investigations against Rambus, taking the view that Rambus engaged in intentional deceptive conduct in the context of the standard-setting process, for example by not disclosing the existence of the patents which it later claimed were relevant to the adopted standard. This type of behavior is known as a "patent ambush". Against this background, the Commission provisionally considered that Rambus breached the EC Treaty's rules on abuse of a dominant market position (Article 82 EC Treaty) by subsequently claiming unreasonable royalties for the use of those relevant patents. The commission's preliminary view was that without its "patent ambush", Rambus would not have been able to charge the royalty rates it currently does.

=== Other settlements ===
In 2013 and 2014, Rambus settled and agreed on licensing terms with several of the companies involved in long-running disputes. On December 13, 2013, Rambus entered an agreement with Micron to let the latter use some of its patents, in exchange for $280 million worth of royalties over seven years. In June 2013, the company settled with SK Hynix, with Hynix paying $240 million to settle the disputes. In March 2014, Rambus and Nanya signed a 5-year patent licensing agreement, settling earlier claims.

Rambus said these deals were part of a change in strategy to a less litigious, more collaborative approach, distancing themselves from accusations of patent trolling. Ronald Black, Rambus's CEO, said, "Somehow we got thrown into the patent troll bunch ... This is just not the case."

== See also ==
- Rambus Inc. v. Nvidia
