= Jameh Mosque of Nain =

Mosque in Nain, Isfahan, Iran

Jāmeh Mosque of Nain
- مسجد جامع نائین
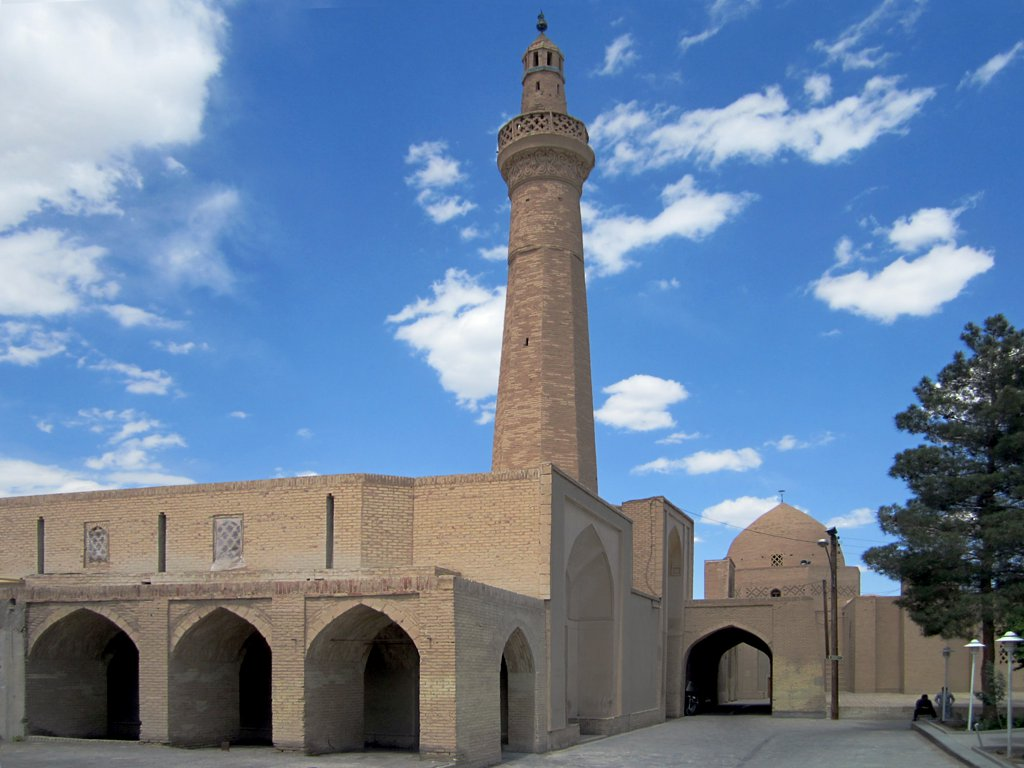

- Location of the mosque in Iran

Religion
- Affiliation: Shia Islam
- Ecclesiastical or organisational status: Friday mosque
- Status: Active

Location
- Location: Nain, Nain County, Isfahan province
- Country: Iran
- Coordinates: 32°52′08″N 53°05′16″E

Architecture
- Type: Mosque architecture
- Style: Abbasid (first structure); Buyid; Timurid; Safavid
- Completed: c. 710s CE (first structure); 10th century (minaret); 1311 CE (minbar); 1382 (door); 14th century (shabestan, iwans)

Specifications
- Dome: One
- Minaret: One
- Materials: Bricks; adobe; plaster

Iran National Heritage List
- Official name: Friday Mosque of Nain
- Type: Friday Mosque
- Designated: 1932
- Reference no.: 144
- Conservation organization: Cultural Heritage, Handicrafts and Tourism Organization of Iran

The Jāmeh Mosque of Nain (Persian: مسجد جامع نایین, romanized: Masjed-e Jâmeʻ-e Nâʼin, lit. 'Great Mosque of Na'in'; Arabic: جامع نائين, romanized: Masjid-i Jami' (Na'in)) is a Shi'ite Friday mosque (jāmeh), located in Nain, in the province of Isfahan, Iran. The mosque is located in the historical city of Na’in, toward the northern edge of the inhabited area in what is now a residential neighborhood. A large arterial road cut through the surrounding area leads from the modern city to the southern corner of the mosque.

The mosque is one of the oldest in Iran and was added to the Iran National Heritage List on 6 January 1932, administered by the Cultural Heritage, Handicrafts and Tourism Organization of Iran.

== Architecture ==
The first mosque structure was completed in c. 710s CE, (Note: Some literature claims it was established in the 9th century.) and is one of the oldest in Iran. Renovated and extended many times since, the mosque was completed in the Khorasani style (sabk), similar to the Tarikhaneh of Damghan and the Jameh Mosque of Isfahan.

The Great Mosque of Na’in is an early Islamic structure, dating from the fourth century AH (late tenth century CE) with some remnants from an earlier phase. The mosque is famous not only for its age but also for its vibrant carved stucco ornamentation adorning the soffits and columns of the prayer hall. The mosque comprises a hypostyle hall of irregular configuration surrounding a small, rectangular sahn. Most of the bays of the hypostyle area surrounding the sahn have no elaborate vaulting; however, there are a few toward the southern corner.

The qibla axis is emphasized by angled piers, and also by the slightly increased width and height of the central nave, forming a lip which projects above the arcade roofline. This structure represents an emergent form of the monumental portal that would later pervade Iranian mosque design.

The Great Mosque of Na'in is known for the extensive and masterful carved stucco of the mihrab and adjacent bays, including the oldest extant epigraphic friezes in Iran. Stylistically it bridges the stucco decoration of the Sasanian and Abbasid periods with that of the Seljuks; effusive vegetal forms released from earlier geometric constraints.

The minaret represents an important transition from the early square form to later rounded forms. Maintaining the early square plan at the base, a tall tapering octagonal mid-section rises to a short cylindrical shaft that terminates in a cornice decorated with carved stucco. The cornice holds a brick railing, forming a balcony upon which stands a thin cylindrical cap, pierced with apertures and resembling a dovecote. Later building additions enclose the minaret which was originally freestanding. The transitional form of this minaret, and its relatively unadorned state suggest that it was completed during the late 4th–early 5th century AH (late 10th–early 11th century CE).

== Gallery ==
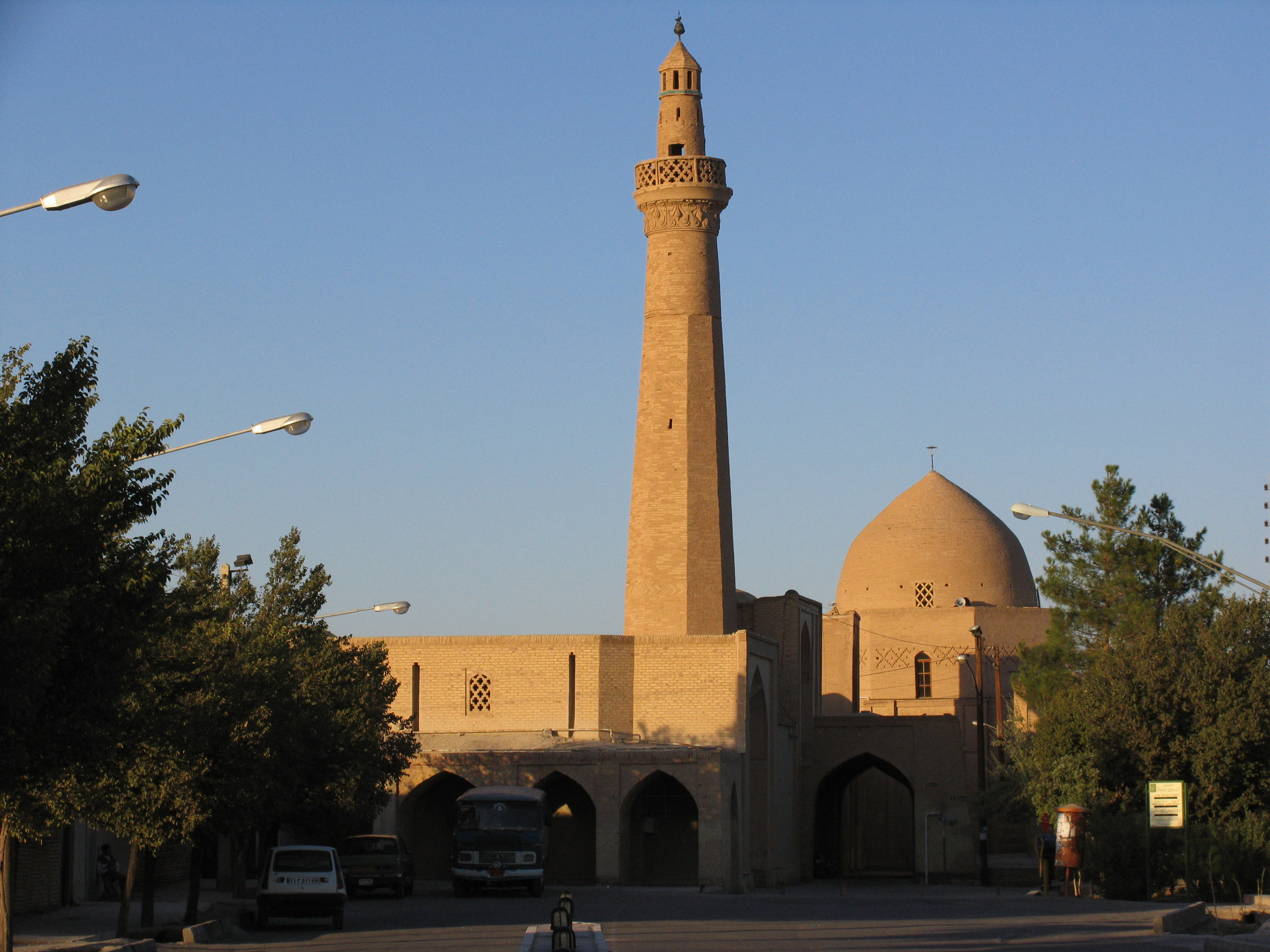
Exterior view

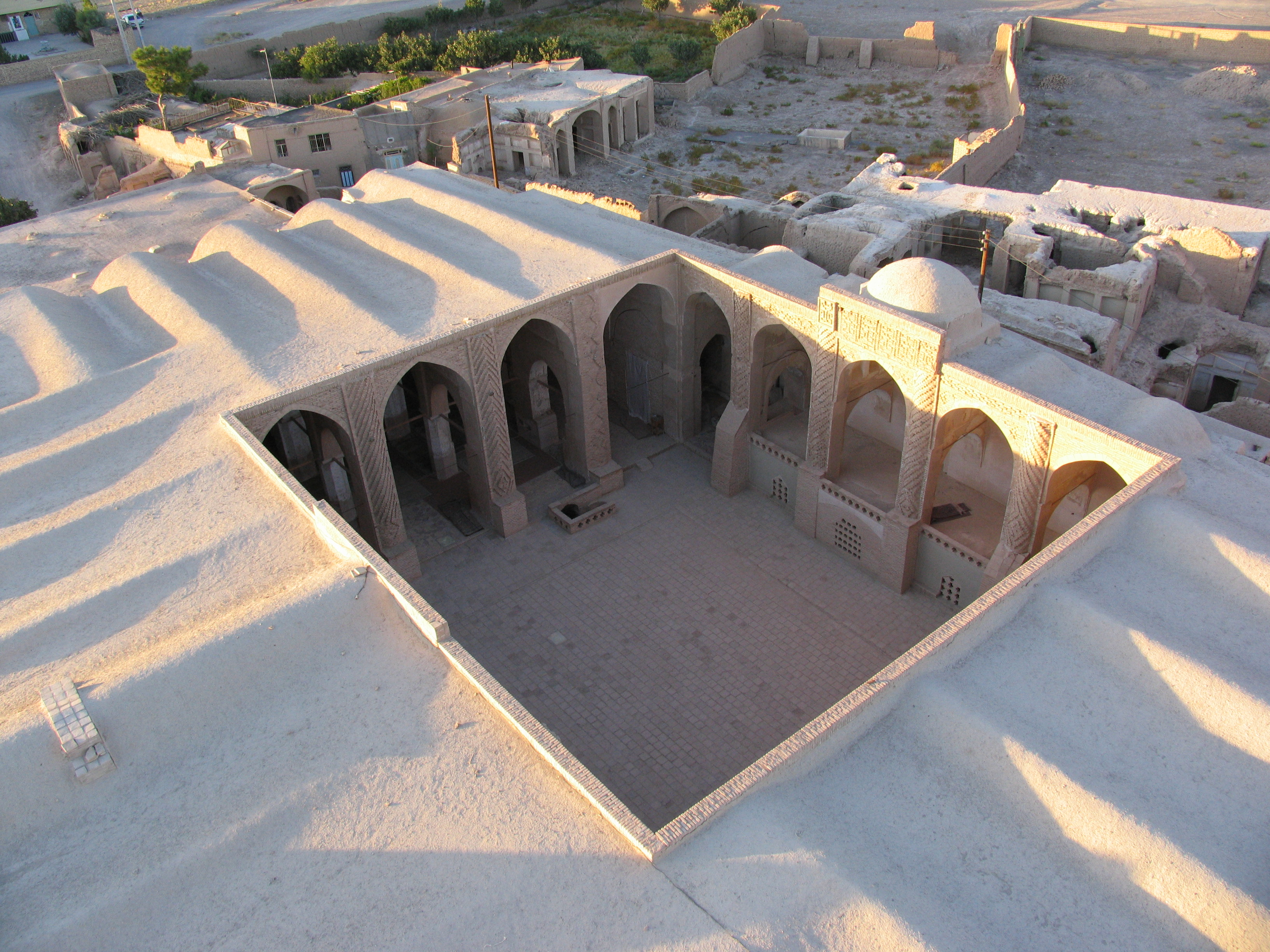
View of courtyard from the top of the minaret

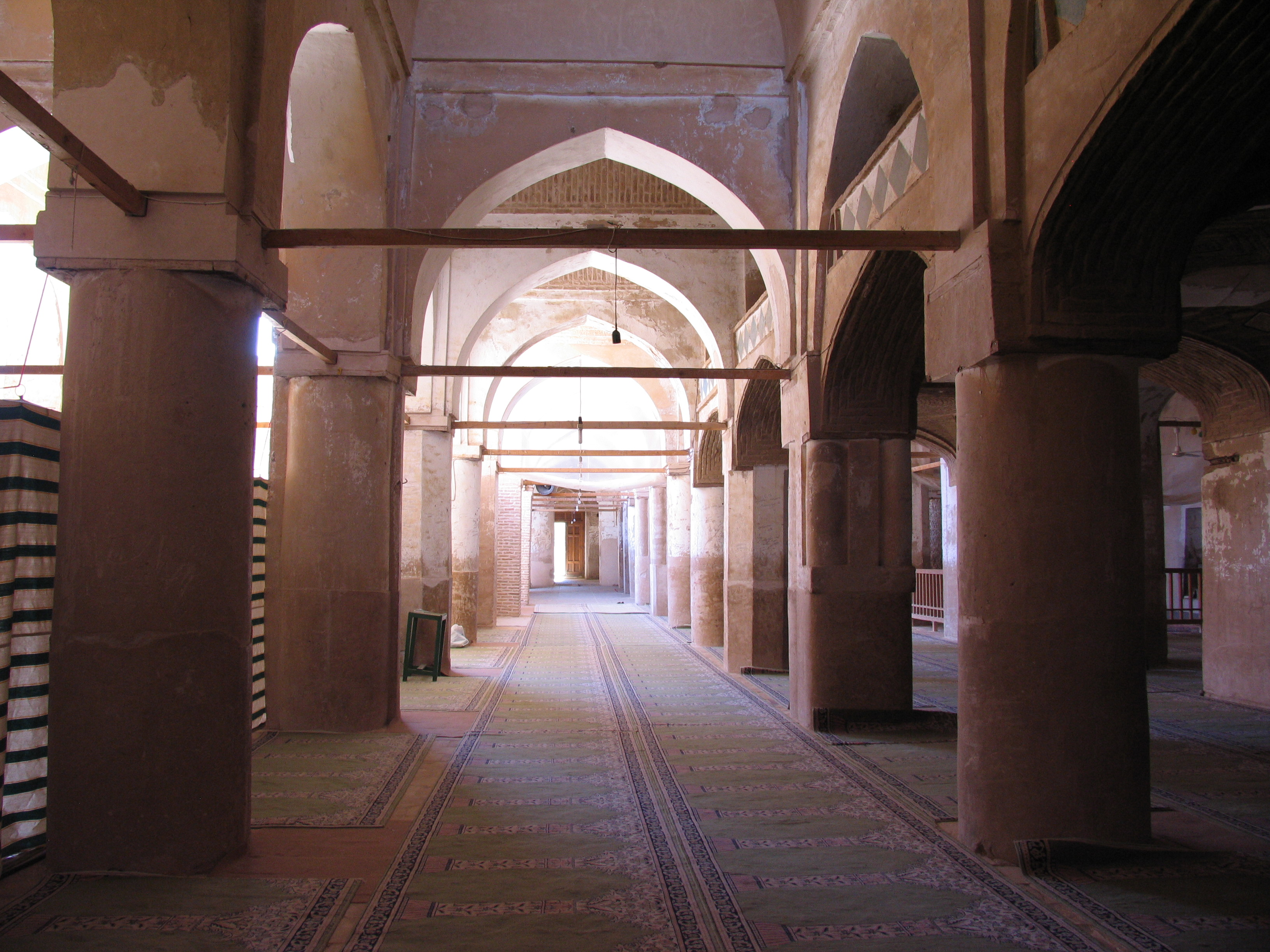
Summer Shabestan

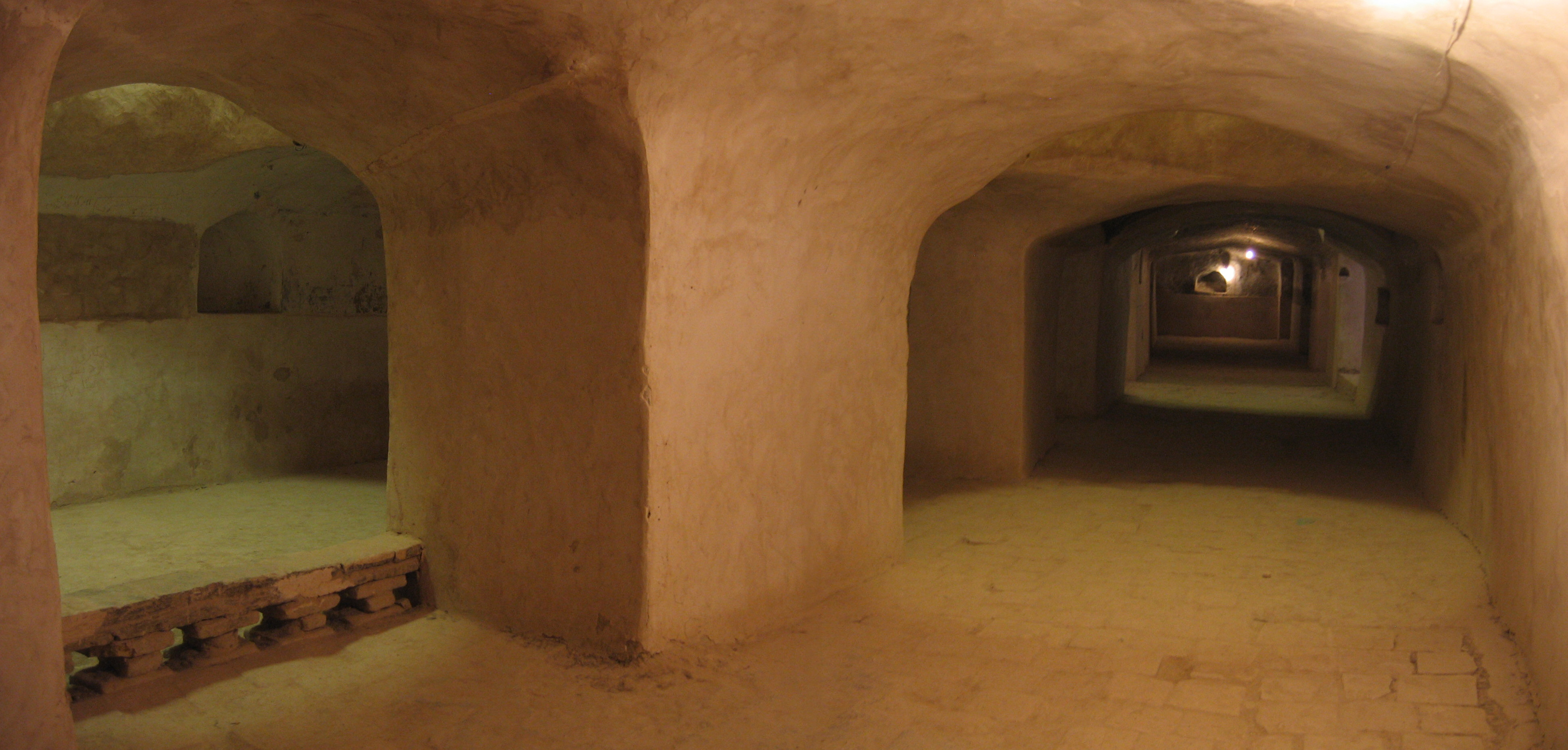
Winter Shabestan

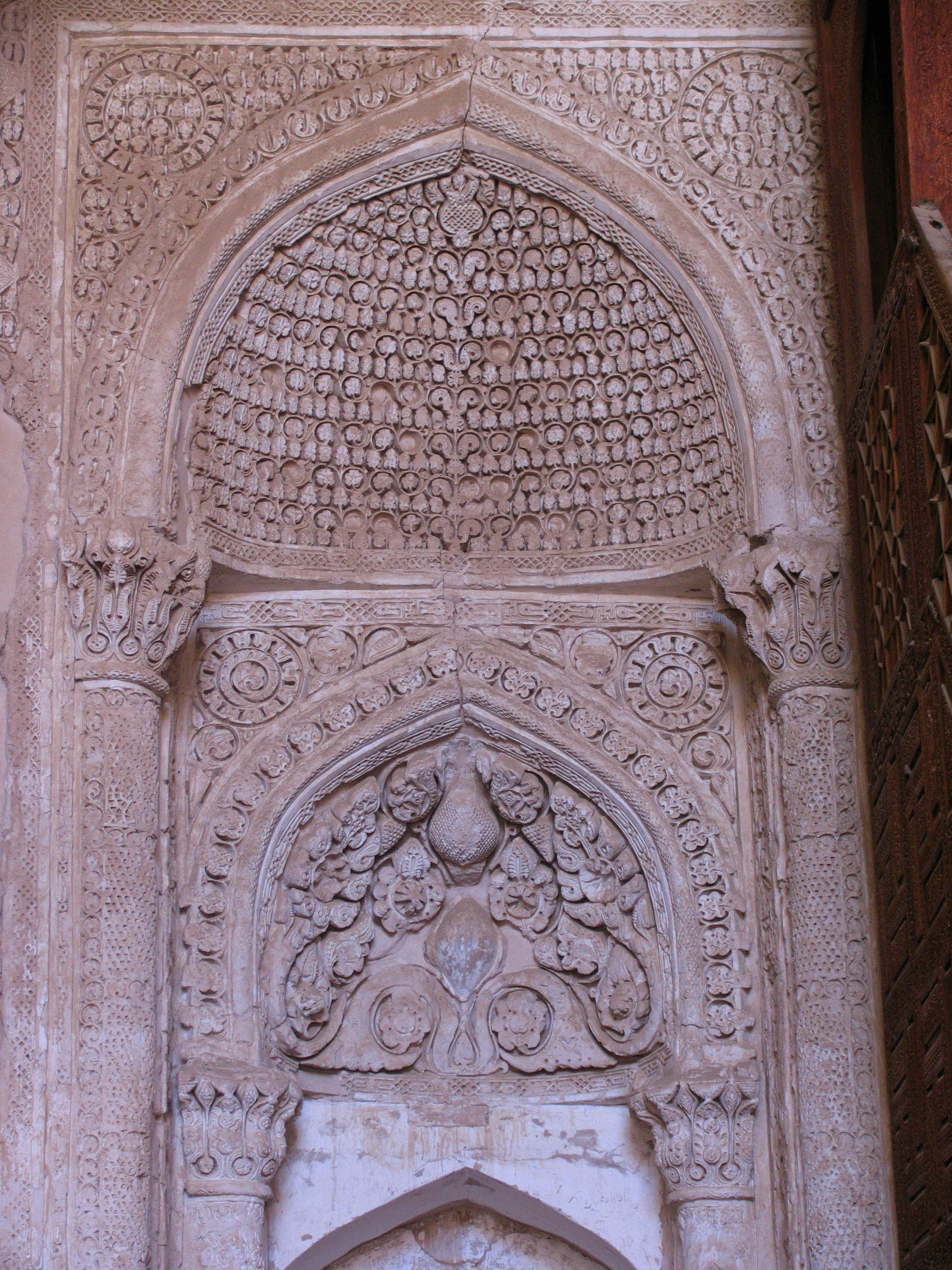
Mihrab

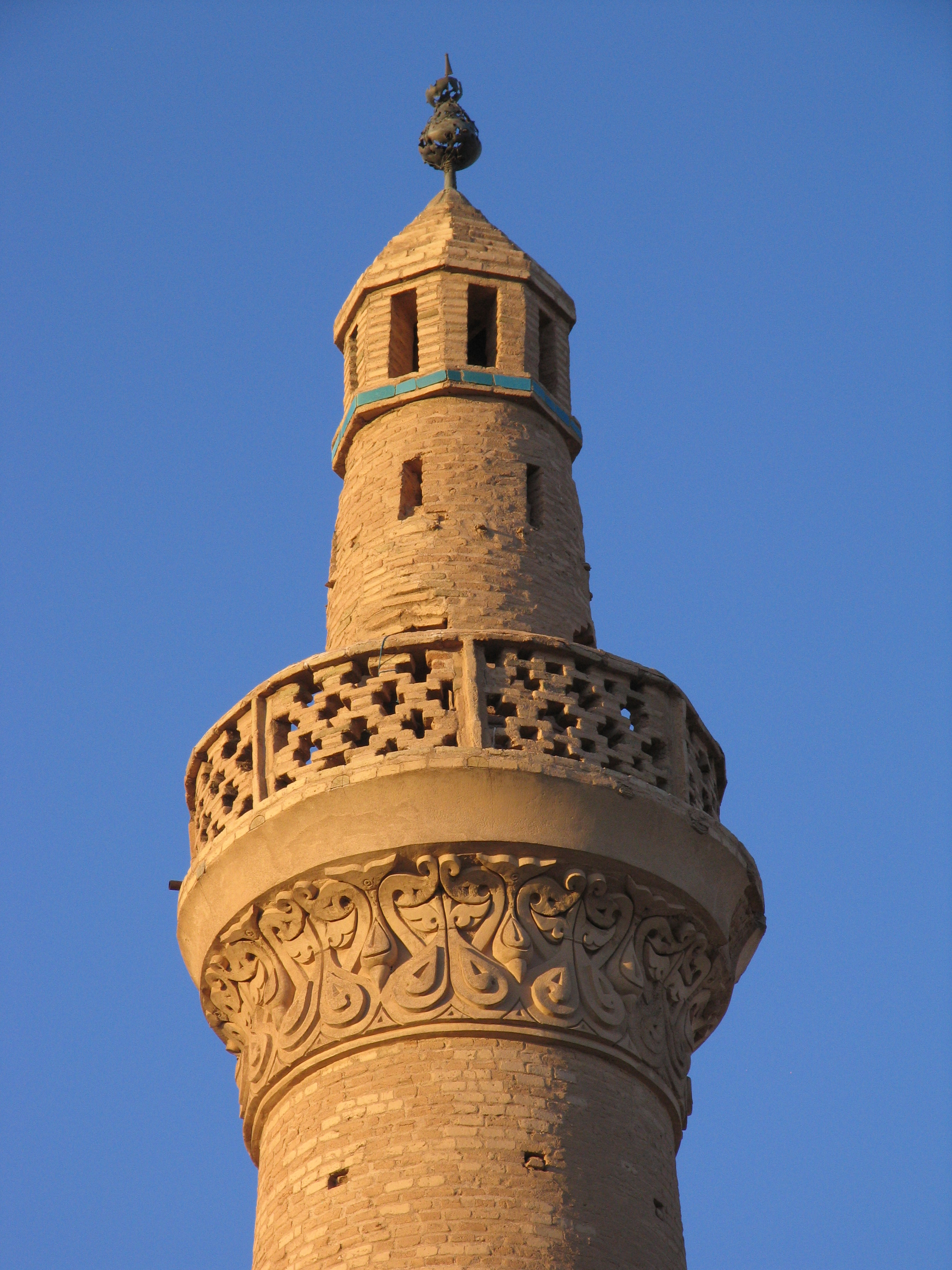
Minaret

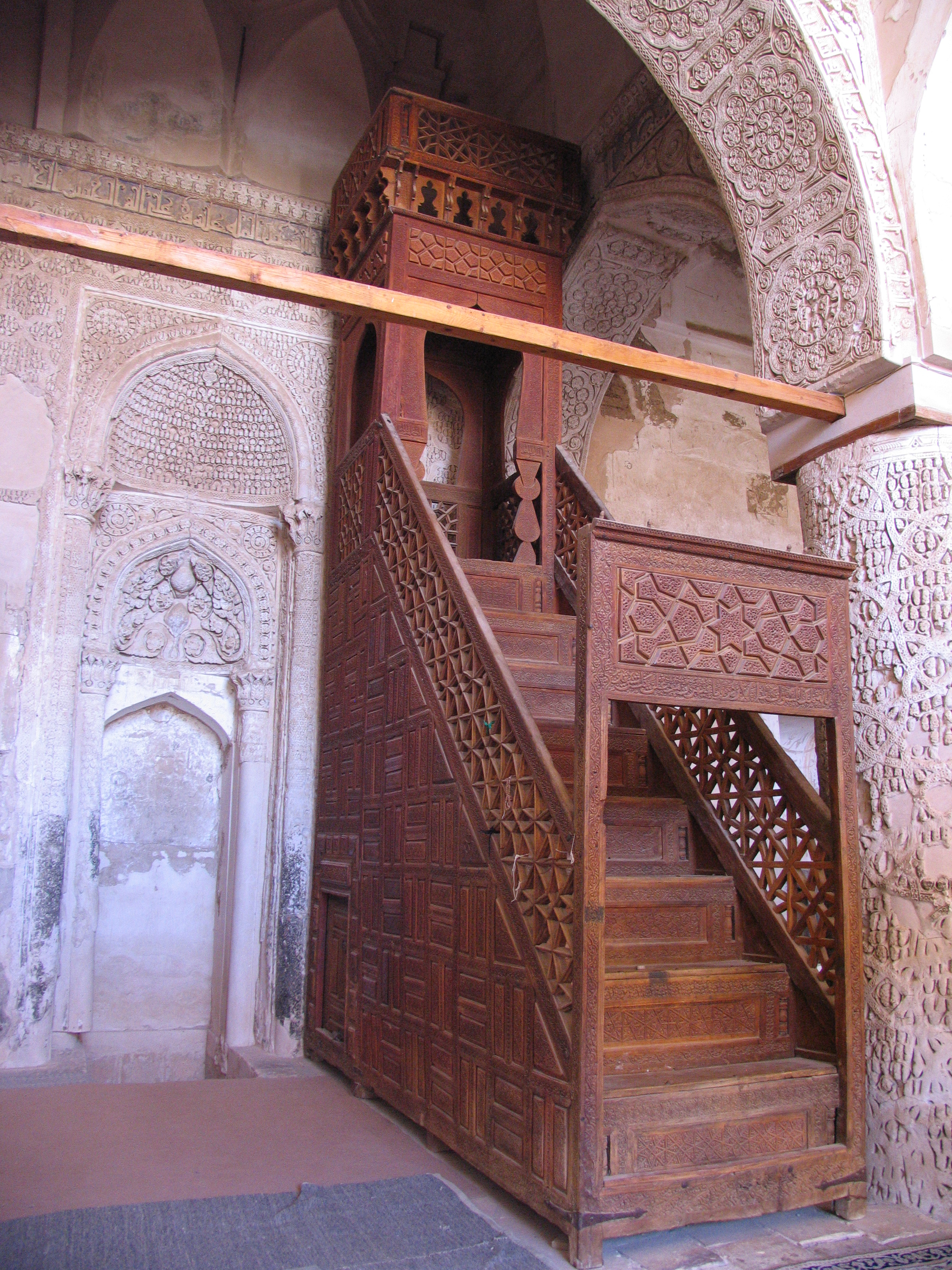
Mihrab

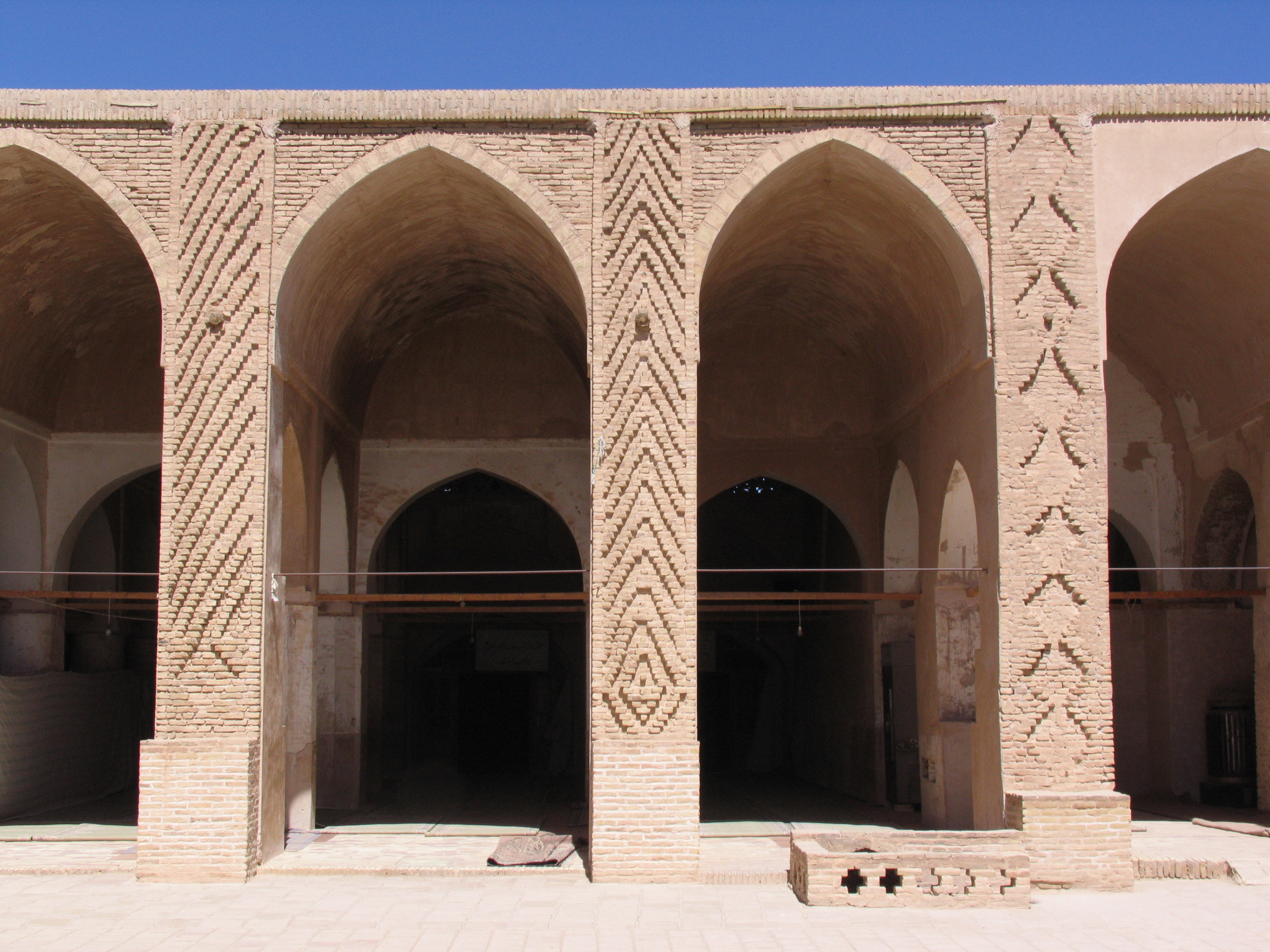
Courtyard

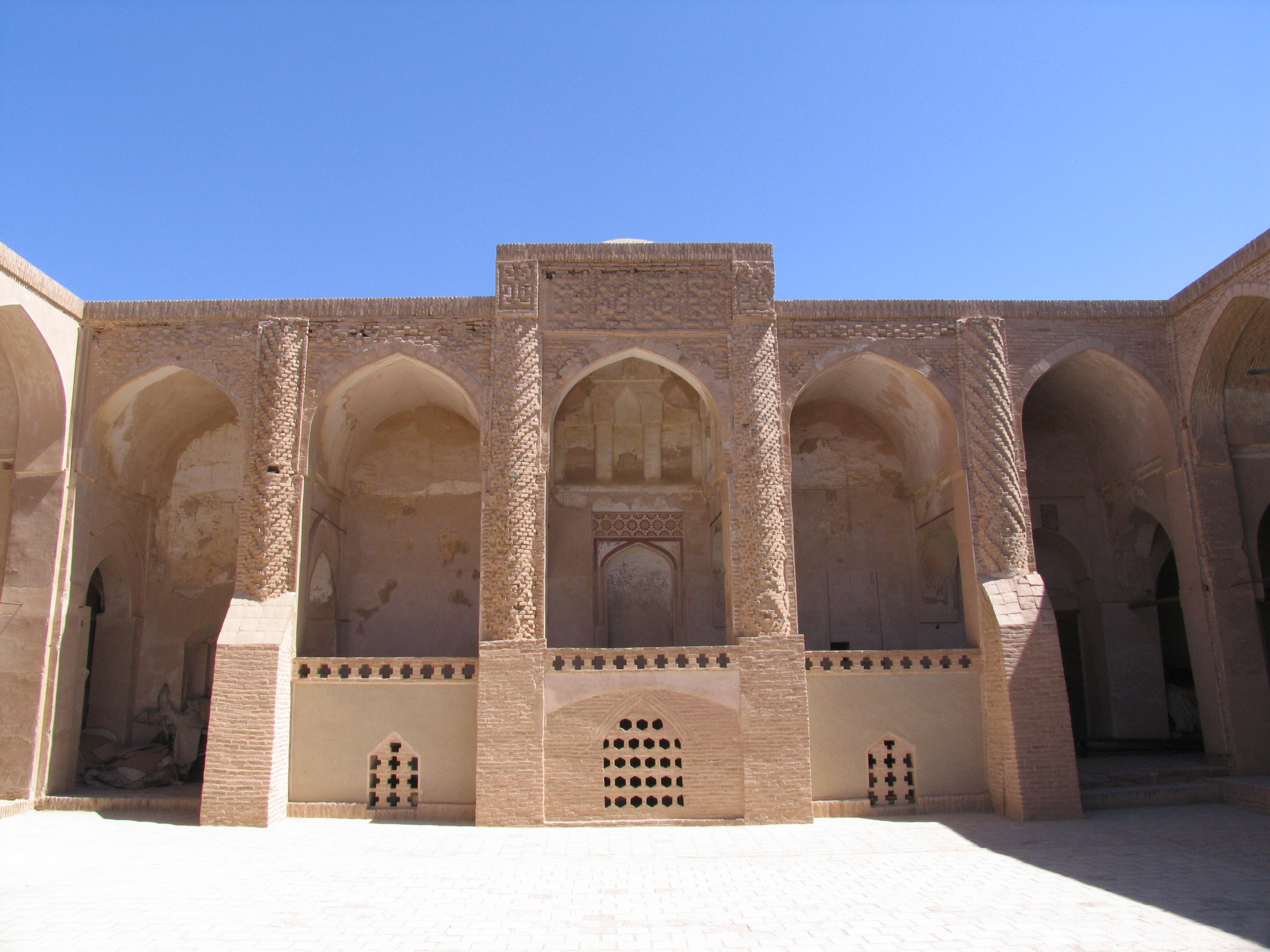
Courtyard

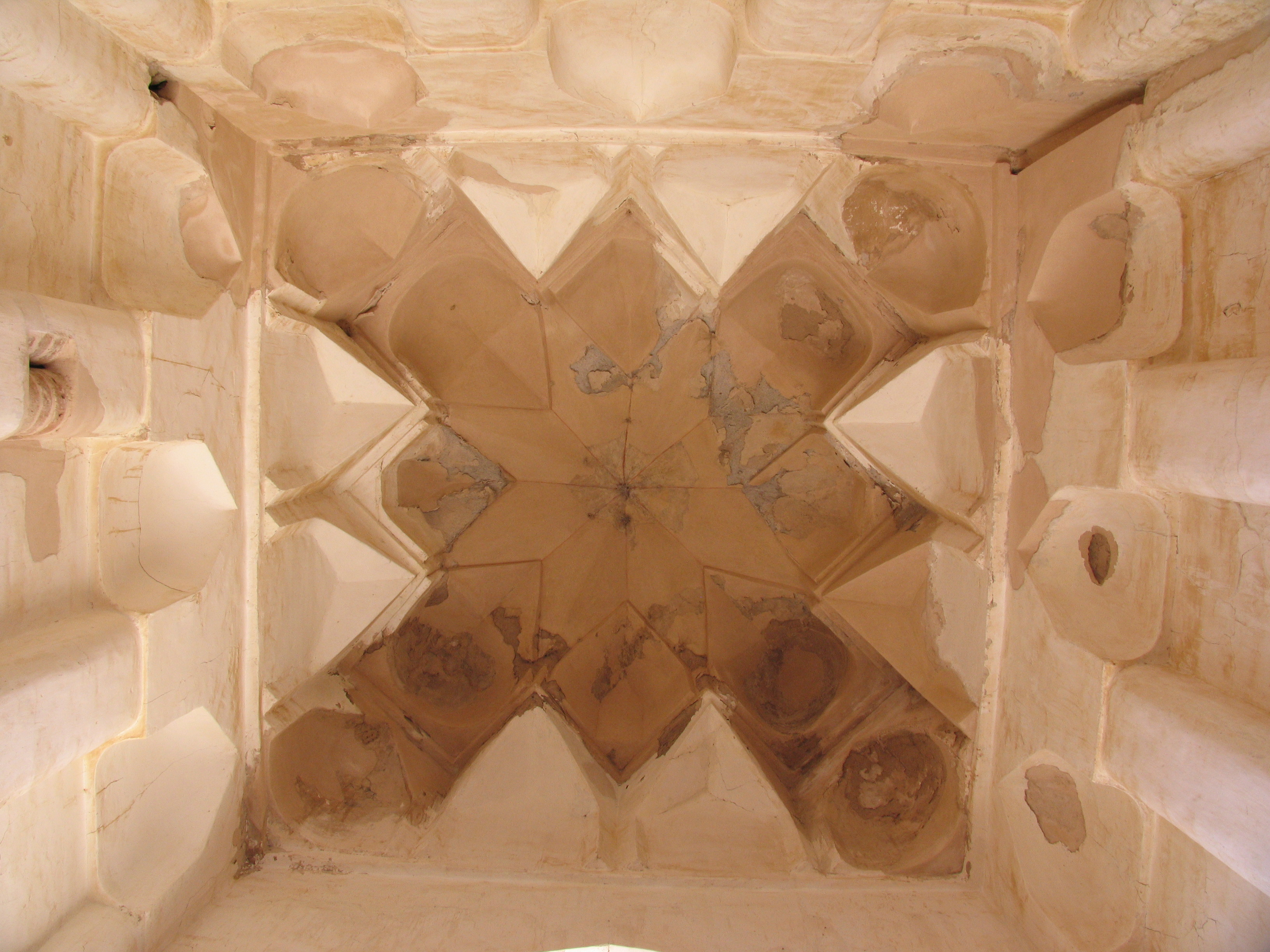
Ceiling

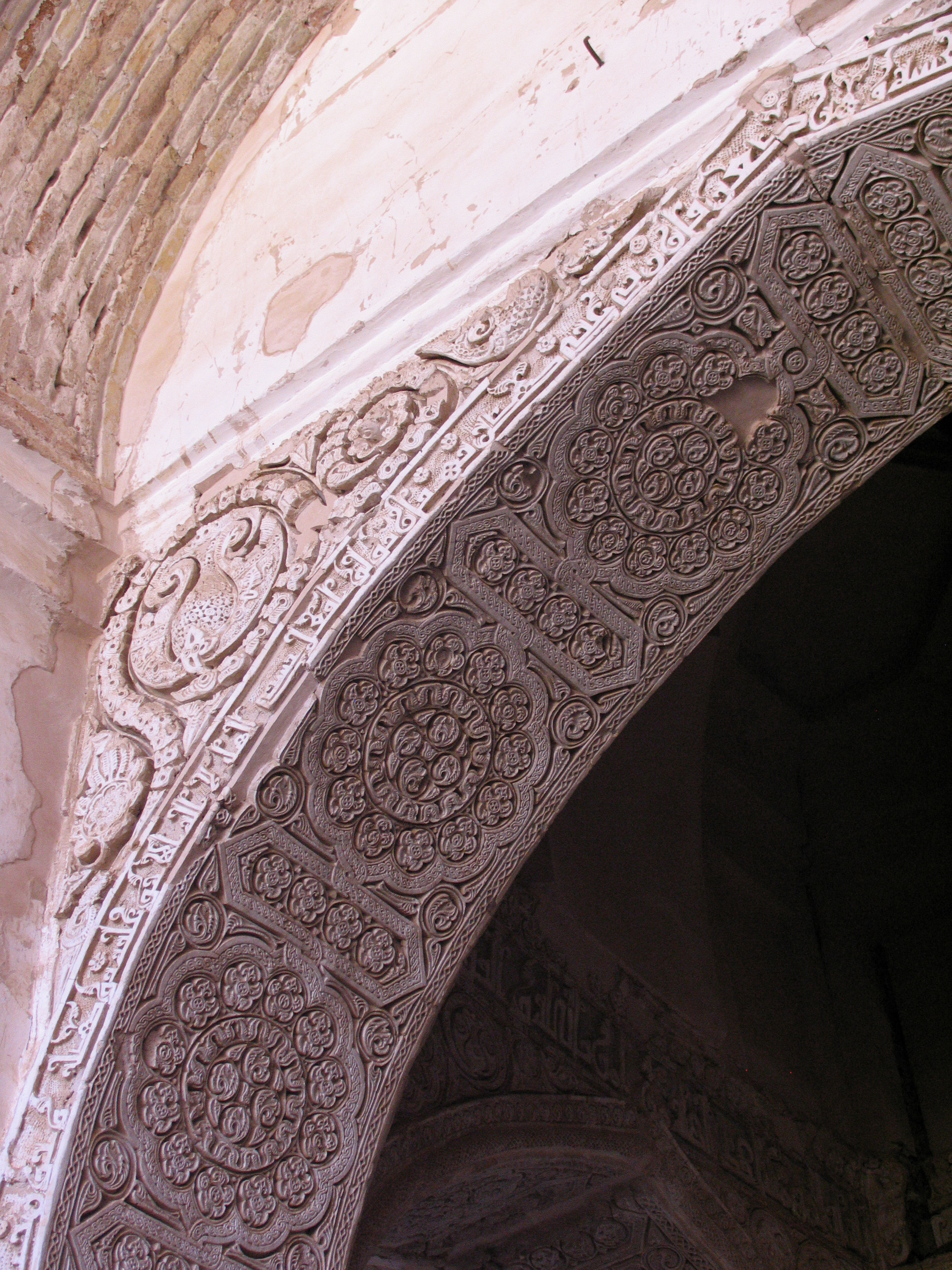
Ornaments

== See also ==
- Shia Islam in Iran
- List of mosques in Iran
- List of historical structures in Isfahan province
