= Azita Emami =

Engineering professor

Azita Emami-Neyestanak
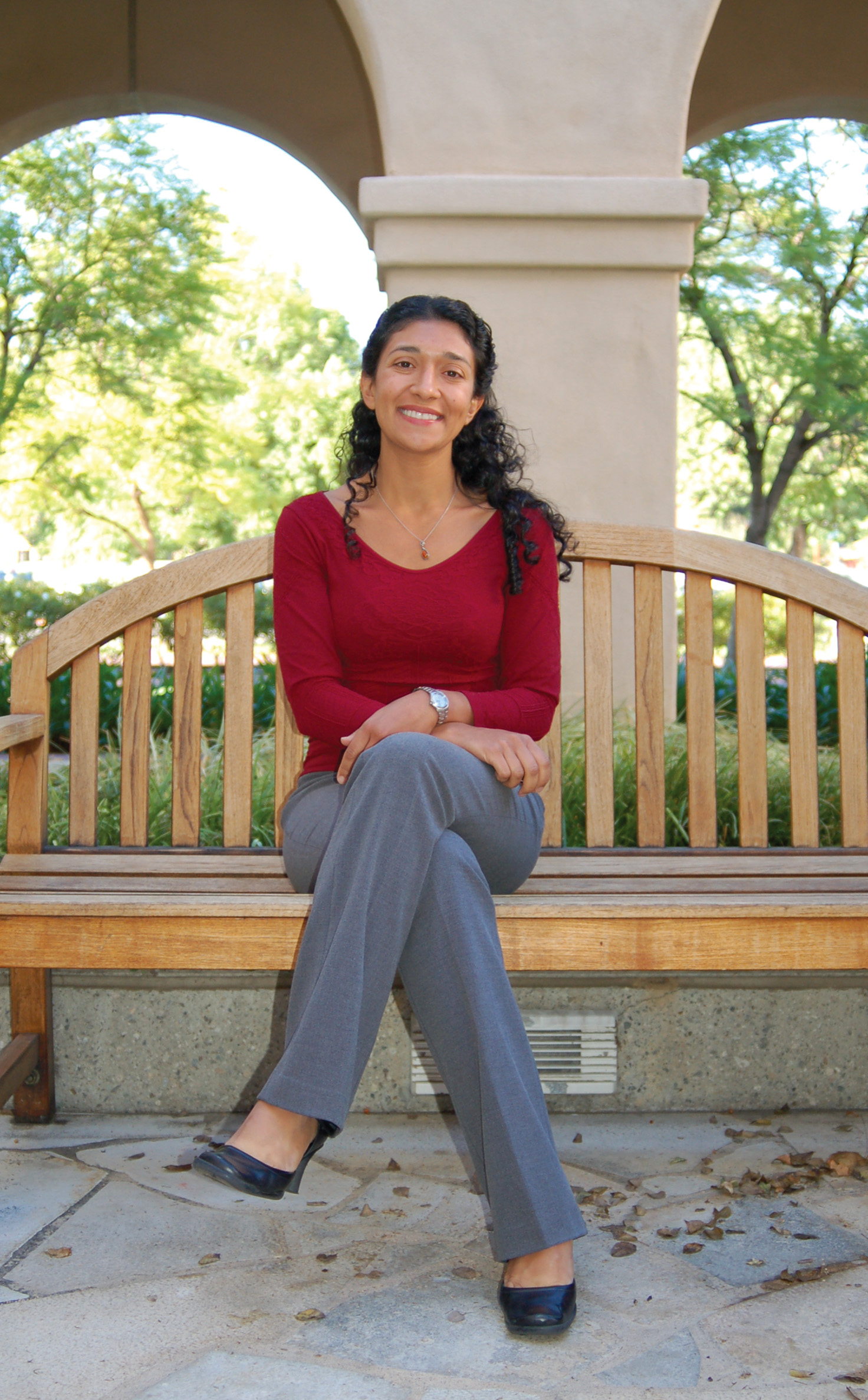
- Azita Emami in 2007
- Born: Nain, Iran
- Education: Stanford University; Sharif University of Technology
- Scientific career
- Fields: Electrical Engineering
- Workplaces: California Institute of Technology; Columbia University
- Thesis: Design of CMOS receivers for parallel optical interconnects
- Doctoral advisor: Mark Horowitz

Azita Emami-Neyestanak is the Andrew and Peggy Cherng Professor of Electrical Engineering and Medical Engineering at Caltech. Emami works on low-power mixed-mode circuits in scalable technologies. She is Executive Officer of the Department of Electrical Engineering and an investigator in the Heritage Medical Research Institute.

== Early life and education ==
Emami was born in Nain, Iran. She studied at an all-girls high school, where she became interested in hardware design. She earned her bachelor's degree in electronic engineering at the Sharif University of Technology in 1996. During her undergraduate degree she created a high performance synthesizer with Direct Digital techniques.

She joined Stanford University for her graduate studies, earning a master's degree in 1999 and a PhD in 2004. At Stanford University she was a member of the very-large-scale-integrated (VLSI) research group, where she worked on integrated circuits and system design. She joined the Thomas J. Watson Research Center in 2004, working on communication technologies. She was an Assistant Professor at Columbia University from 2006 to 2007. Her early work used simulations and measurement to evaluate CMOS technology operating at sub-Nyquist rates.

== Research and career ==
Emami joined the California Institute of Technology in 2007. She was awarded a National Science Foundation CAREER Award to investigate integrated systems in 2008, studying the electro-optical connects in integrated systems. She was awarded an Okawa Foundation grant in 2010, allowing her to investigate the design of high performance sensors. In 2015 Emami was appointed as a Principal Investigator of the Heritage Medical Research Institute.

Emami's work involves the design of energy efficient ways to interface the information and physical worlds. Her research group, MICS (Mixed-mode Integrated Circuits and Systems), study circuits for data communication, sensing and biomedical devices. She focusses on low-power consumption devices, such as microdevices that can act as photoreceptors for people who suffer from vision loss. She achieves low power consumption by using clocking techniques. The photoreceptor-like devices can transmit information to the retinal nerves, and, crucially, can operate at low power as any overheating may damage human tissue.

In a collaboration with the Doheny Eye Institute, Emami developed retinal eye implants that were based on ultra-low power flexible circuits. The circuits included hundreds of electrodes that could be used to stimulate the cells in the eye. Designing electronic components for the eye is not trivial - unlike most circuitry, they cannot be flat. Emami collaborated with an origami expert to develop an implant that could match the contour of a retina. Following this project, Emami worked with Yu-Chong Tai to create intraocular pressure sensors that can monitor eye pressure in patients who suffer from glaucoma. To ensure the sensors are biocompatible, Emami encapsulated them in 'Parylene-on-oil', a silicone-oil bubble surrounded by Parylene. Working with Axel Scherer, Emami has developed an implantable glucose monitor that can transmit information via bluetooth to a wearable reader. The sensors can alert physicians in the event of a blood sugar dip or spike. One of her undergraduate students proposed a way for the glucose sensor to operate on low-power, using an analog to digital conversion.

In her position at the Heritage Medical Research Institute, Emami creates microdevices that can be used to monitor health and provide treatment inside patients' bodies. Emami has developed a biosensor that can continuously monitor vital information, including blood sugar, pH levels and cortisol, as well as acting as a therapeutic system, releasing insulin or other medicine. She collaborated with Mikhail Shapiro to develop a device called 'Addressable Transmitters Operated as Magnetic Spins' (ATOMS), which uses principles of magnetic resonance imaging to locate the device in the human body. The ATOMS chips contain integrated resonators, sensors and wireless transmission technology, which allows them to be located using magnetic fields. Her group are currently evaluating the performance of ATOMS in vitro and in vivo, monitoring device migration in live mice and creating the platform that will allow navigation in high-precision surgery. She has also investigated efficient neural interfaces. In 2017 Emami was appointed the Andrew and Peggy Cherng Professor of Electrical Engineering and Medical Engineering at Caltech. The Chair is endowed by the co-founders of Panda Express.

=== Academic service ===
Emami is the Associate Editor for the Institute of Electrical and Electronics Engineers (IEEE) Journal of Solid State Circuits and has served as the IEEE SSCS distinguished lecturer. She serves as the Executive Officer of the Department of Electrical Engineering at Caltech. Alongside her academic research, Emami works on initiatives to improve diversity in engineering.
