= Intel 850 =

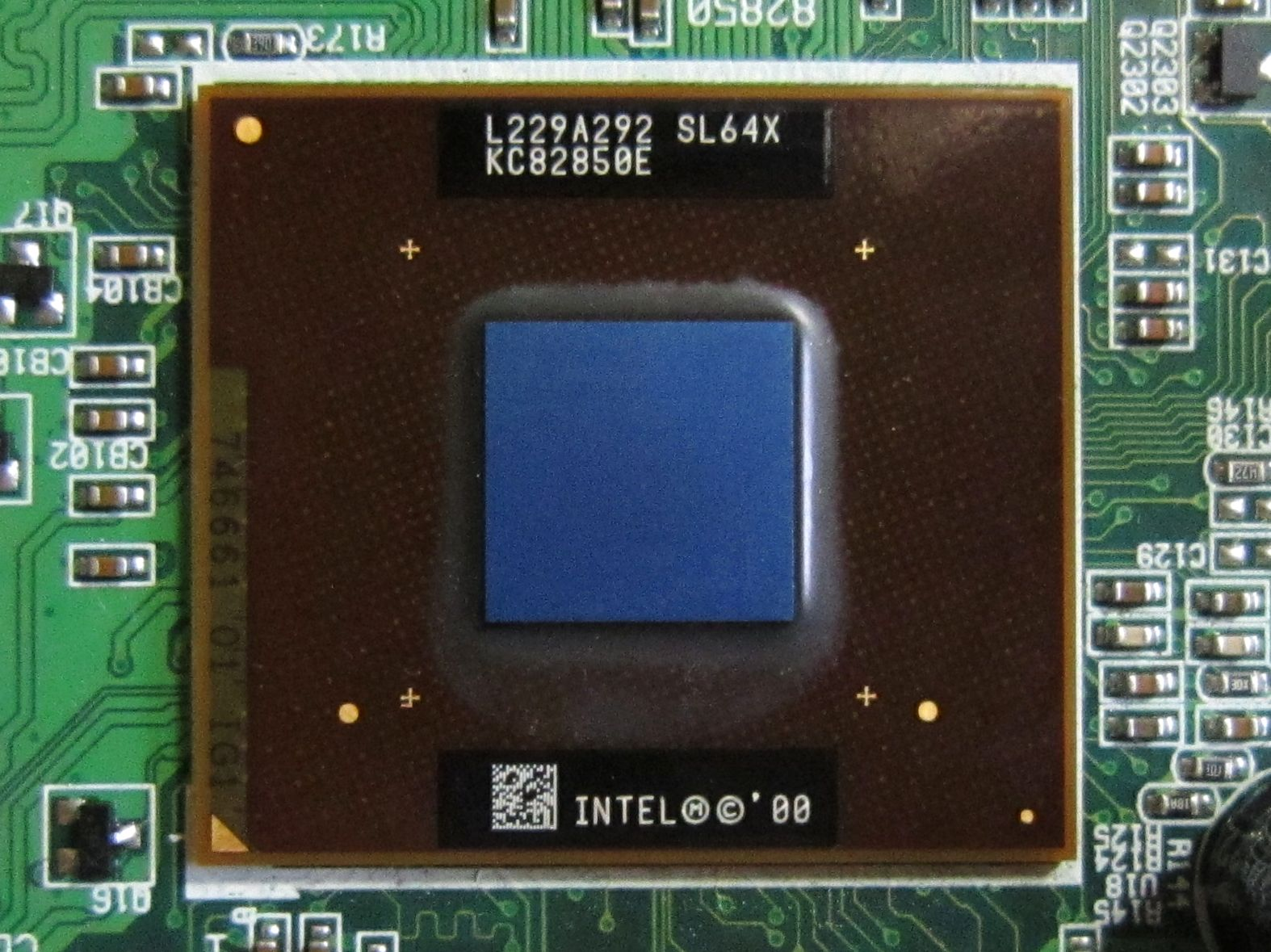
Intel 850E MCH

The Intel 850 chipset was the first chipset available for the Pentium 4 processor, and was simultaneously released in November 2000. It consists of an 82850 memory controller hub and an 82801BA I/O controller hub.

This chipset outperforms the AMD 760 chipset with the 266 MHz FSB. Despite using (supposedly) high-performance expensive RDRAM, performance was mediocre at best. In early 2002, this chipset was superseded by the Intel 845, which used slower but much less expensive SDRAM or DDR SDRAM.

The Intel 855 chipset released at the same time as the Pentium M and Celeron M, and the lower Intel 852 chipset are completely different products and are not covered in this article.

== Features ==
- Socket 423 or Socket 478 CPU compatible with 400 MHz FSB
- Supports P4 CPUs at 1.3 GHz or Faster
- Four PC800 RDRAM slots compatible with ECC
- Up to 2 GB memory supported.
- AGP 4X slot

== Intel 850E ==
The Intel 850E chipset added PC1066 RDRAM support and 533 MHz FSB support.

== Overview ==
The Intel 850 (i850) is the name and family name of the chipset for the NetBurst microprocessor platform announced by Intel in September 2001. The development code name is Tehama.

It consists of a hub architecture since the Intel 810, which combines the Memory Controller Hub (MCH), which is equivalent to the north bridge, and the ICH (I / O Controller Hub), which is equivalent to the south bridge. These are connected by a Hub Link with a bandwidth of 266 MB/s.

The biggest feature of the Intel 850 is that it supports dual channel RDRAM. The Intel 850 supports 16bit RIMM of PC600 or PC800, and the memory bandwidth reached 3,2 GB/s when using PC800 RIMM (Rambus Inline Memory Module). This is three times the memory bandwidth of 1,06 GB/s of PC133 SDRAM, which was the mainstream in the previous generation, and matches the bandwidth of 3,2 GB/s of FSB of QDR 400MHz adopted in Pentium 4.

However, since the memory support has been deferred even in the minor change version of Intel 850E whose FSB has been raised to 533MHz with a bandwidth of 4,2 GB/s, it is a specification that the memory bandwidth is insufficient for the bandwidth of FSB when using FSB 533MHz.

ICH has a solid structure other than that it supports RDRAM, such as the adoption of ICH2, which has a proven track record, and it does not support the SMP function.

The Intel 850 was launched at the same time as the announcement of the Pentium 4 as a chipset for the Pentium 4 system.

However, the Intel 850 was hindered by various factors such as the high price of RIMM, and it did not spread as Intel thought. While the spread of the Intel 850 was stagnant, AMD's platform strengthened its presence, and the Intel 845, which should have been a low-end product released in a hurry to counter it, became more popular than the Intel 850. Although the Intel 850E with FSB 533MHz was announced in May 2002, Intel abandoned the spread of the Intel 850 and RDRAM and switched the mainstay of the Pentium 4 chipset to the Intel 845 family.

In May 2003, the Intel 850 family ended its role with the announcement of its successors, the Intel E7205 and Intel E7505.

== MCH ==
The MCH Intel 82850 supports dual channel RDRAM as main memory. RIMMs that can be used are 16-bit PC600 or PC800. PC700 cannot be used. In the minor change version of Intel 850E, a motherboard compatible with 32- bit RIMM is also on sale.

Unlike the Intel 820 and later dual channel DDR SDRAM compatible chipsets, it cannot operate on a single channel. Therefore, when using a 16-bit RIMM, it is necessary to install two or four RIMMs of the same capacity and speed and use them in dual channel (a 32-bit RIMM can operate with one). Also, since it is necessary to install a dummy module called C-RIMM in the memory socket that does not have RIMM installed, many motherboards bundled C-RIMM.

It is connected to the CPU by FSB operating in QDR. Early models only supported 400 MHz, but with the introduction of the FSB 533MHz version of Pentium 4, the Intel 850E supports 533MHz operation.

It supports AGP 2.0 compliant AGP 4x slots for graphics, but doesn't have built-in graphics.

Also, despite being a performance chipset, it does not support the SMP function. This has been followed in subsequent performance chipsets.

The 82850 series was supplied in the FC- BGA package (Flip Chip Ball Grid Array Package) manufactured according to the 0.13 μm process rule. The Intel 850 was the first Intel chipset to be supplied by FC-BGA, so it was said that it looked like a Coppermine core when it first appeared.

== See also ==
- List of Intel chipsets
