= Nain, Iran =

City in Isfahan province, Iran

Nain Persian: نائین
- City
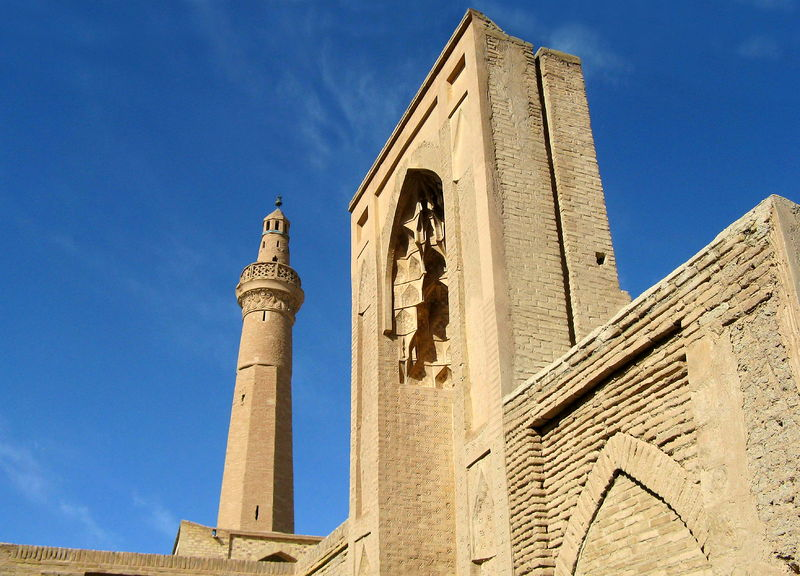
- Jameh Mosque of Nain

- Location within Iran
- Coordinates: 32°51′28″N 53°05′04″E
- Country: Iran
- Province: Isfahan
- County: Nain
- District: Central

Population (2016)
  - Total: 27,379
- Time zone: UTC+3:30 (IRST)

Nain (Persian: نائین) (Note: Also Romanized as Nāein, Nāeyn, and Nāīn) is a city in the Central District of Nain County, Isfahan province, Iran, serving as capital of both the county and the district.

== History ==
The history of Nain appears to go back to pre-Islamic times, but no information about it has survived. It is famous for its big castle and its congregational mosque, the Jameh Mosque of Nain. It was described by medieval historians to have been in the sardsīr ("cooler highland areas"), and being a subordinate to either Yazd or Isfahan, despite being part of the administration of the Fars province.

The historian and geographer Hamdallah Mustawfi reported that the walls of Nain's castle, which are still present as mud brick remnants, were four thousand paces long. The nearby mountains' silver mines are also described by the geographers. During the Safavid era, the kaolinite of Nain was utilized to manufacture porcelain at the city of Kashan.

Under the Buyid dynasty (934–1062), the Jameh Mosque of Nain was constructed.

== Demographics ==
=== Language ===
The following graph depicts the language composition of the city. Naini is a Central Plateau language which is part of the Northwestern Iranian languages.

Ilam linguistic composition
Language	percent
Naini	70%
Tehrani Persian	30%

=== Population ===
At the time of the 2006 National Census, the city's population was 24,424 in 6,954 households. The following census in 2011 counted 25,379 people in 7,730 households. The 2016 census measured the population of the city as 27,379 people in 8,906 households.

== Climate ==
Climate data for Nain (1992-2010 normals)
Month	Jan	Feb	Mar	Apr	May	Jun	Jul	Aug	Sep	Oct	Nov	Dec	Year
Mean daily maximum °C (°F)	9.4 (48.9)	13.1 (55.6)	17.3 (63.1)	23.5 (74.3)	28.6 (83.5)	34.1 (93.4)	36.4 (97.5)	35.2 (95.4)	31.4 (88.5)	25.0 (77.0)	17.0 (62.6)	11.7 (53.1)	23.6 (74.4)
Daily mean °C (°F)	3.7 (38.7)	6.9 (44.4)	11.0 (51.8)	16.8 (62.2)	21.6 (70.9)	26.6 (79.9)	29.1 (84.4)	27.6 (81.7)	23.6 (74.5)	17.8 (64.0)	10.7 (51.3)	5.8 (42.4)	16.8 (62.2)
Mean daily minimum °C (°F)	−1.9 (28.6)	0.7 (33.3)	4.6 (40.3)	10.2 (50.4)	14.6 (58.3)	19.1 (66.4)	21.9 (71.4)	19.9 (67.8)	15.9 (60.6)	10.7 (51.3)	4.3 (39.7)	0.0 (32.0)	10.0 (50.0)
Average precipitation mm (inches)	20.7 (0.81)	11.6 (0.46)	20.8 (0.82)	11.1 (0.44)	11.5 (0.45)	1.0 (0.04)	0.4 (0.02)	0.2 (0.01)	0.1 (0.00)	1.6 (0.06)	6.9 (0.27)	12.2 (0.48)	98.1 (3.86)
Average snowy days	2.3	1.0	0.4	0	0	0	0	0	0	0	0.1	0.8	4.6
Average relative humidity (%)	50	40	33	29	24	18	19	18	19	26	36	45	30
Average dew point °C (°F)	−5.3 (22.5)	−6.4 (20.5)	−5.0 (23.0)	−1.9 (28.6)	0.0 (32.0)	1.0 (33.8)	4.0 (39.2)	2.2 (36.0)	0.1 (32.2)	−1.9 (28.6)	−3.7 (25.3)	−5.0 (23.0)	−1.8 (28.7)
Source: IRIMO(temperatures), (humidity), (dew point 1992-2005), (precipitation), (snow/sleet days)

== Notable people ==
- Azita Emami (born 1963), Iranian-American engineer working on low-power mixed-mode circuits in scalable technologies; Professor of Electrical Engineering and Medical Engineering at the California Institute of Technology

== See also ==
Media related to Nain, Iran at Wikimedia Commons

Na'in travel guide from Wikivoyage

== Sources ==
- Bosworth, C. Edmund; Ruggles, D. Fairchild (2019). "Nāʾīn". In Fleet, Kate; Krämer, Gudrun; Matringe, Denis; Nawas, John; Rowson, Everett (eds.). Encyclopaedia of Islam (3rd ed.). Brill Online. ISSN 1873-9830.
- Stilo, Donald (2007). "Isfahan xxi. Provincial Dialects". In Yarshater, Ehsan (ed.). Encyclopædia Iranica. Vol. XIV/1: Isfahan IX. Pahlavi period–Isfahan XXII. Gazi dialect. London and New York: Routledge & Kegan Paul. pp. 93–112. ISBN 978-0-933273-99-3.
