= Mark Alan Horowitz =

American computer architect (born 1957)

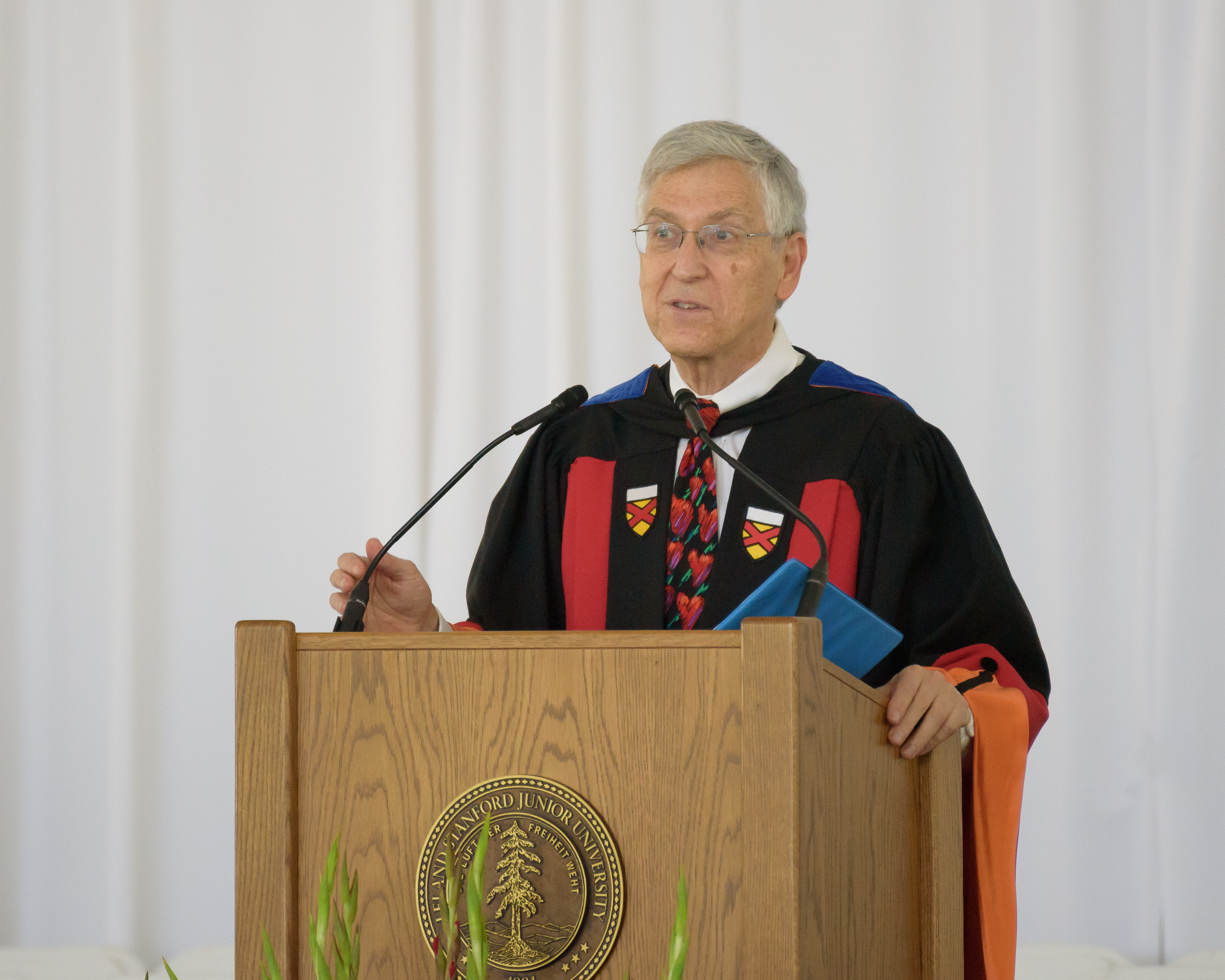
- Mark Horowitz in 2025
- Born: April 6, 1957; Washington D.C., U.S.
- Education: Massachusetts Institute of Technology; Stanford University
- Known for: Processors, VLSI design, high-speed links, light-field photography
- Awards: IEEE Donald O. Pederson Award in Solid-State Circuits; National Academy of Engineering member; American Academy of Arts and Sciences Fellow; Association for Computing Machinery - IEEE CS Eckert–Mauchly Award; ACM Fellow; IEEE Fellow; Semiconductor Industry Association Faculty Research Award
- Scientific career
- Fields: Electrical Engineering, Computer Science
- Workplaces: Stanford University
- Thesis: Timing Models for MOS Circuits
- Doctoral advisor: Robert Dutton
- Doctoral students: Azita Emami; Chih-Kong Ken Yang; Michael D. Smith; John M. Acken

Mark Alan Horowitz is an American electrical engineer, computer scientist, inventor, and entrepreneur who is the Yahoo! Founders Professor in the School of Engineering and the Fortinet Founders Chair of the Department of Electrical Engineering at Stanford University. He holds a joint appointment in the Electrical Engineering and Computer Science departments and previously served as the Chair of the Electrical Engineering department from 2008 to 2012. He is a co-founder, the former chairman, and the former chief scientist of Rambus Inc. Horowitz has authored over 700 published conference and research papers and is among the most highly-cited computer architects of all time. He is a prolific inventor and holds 374 patents as of 2023.

== Education ==
Horowitz received bachelor's and master's degrees in electrical engineering from the Massachusetts Institute of Technology in 1978. After graduating, he moved to Silicon Valley to work at Signetics, one of the early integrated circuits companies. After working for a year, he entered Stanford, and worked on CAD tools for very-large-scale integration (VLSI) design. His research at Stanford included some of the earliest work on extracting the resistance of integrated circuit wires, and estimating the delay of MOS transistor circuits. He was advised at Stanford by Robert Dutton and graduated with a Ph.D. in electrical engineering in 1984.

== Academic career ==
In 1984, Horowitz joined the Stanford faculty. At Stanford his research focused on VLSI circuits and he led a number of early RISC processor designs, including MIPS-X. His research has been in the fields of electrical engineering, computer science, and applying engineering tools to biology. He has worked on RISC processors, multiprocessor designs, low-power circuits, high-speed links, computational photography, and genomics. Horowitz and his research group at Stanford pioneered many innovations in high-speed link design, and many of today’s high speed link designs are designed by his former students or colleagues from Rambus.

In the 2000s he teamed up with Marc Levoy to work on computational photography, research which explored how to use computation to create better pictures, often by using data from multiple sensors. This research also explored light-field photography, which captured enough information to allow a computer to reconstruct the view to an arbitrary viewpoint. The need to capture light-fields to process led to the creation of the Stanford Camera Array, a system which could synchronize and collect images from 100 image sensors, as well as work that eventually led to the Lytro camera, whose photographs could be refocused after they were captured.

In 2006, Horowitz received the IEEE Donald O. Pederson Award in Solid-State Circuits "for pioneering contributions to the design of high-performance digital integrated circuits and systems". In 2007, he was elected to the National Academy of Engineering for his "leadership in high-bandwidth memory-interface technology and in scalable cache-coherent multiprocessor architectures." In 2008, he was elected to the American Academy of Arts and Sciences. At the 2014 International Solid-State Circuits Conference, he presented his studies on the outlook for the semiconductor industry in Computing's Energy Problem (And What We Can Do About It).

In 2018 Horowitz founded the AHA Agile Hardware Project at Stanford University and has led it ever since. The program aims to "enable a more agile hardware development flow" by creating "an open source hardware/software tool chain to rapidly create and validate alternative hardware implementations and a new open-source system ARM/CGRA SoC which will enable rapid execution/emulation of the resulting design." The project is funded by Intel's Science and Technology Center, DARPA, the National Science Foundation, Amazon Web Services, Meta Platforms Inc.,Apple Inc., Advanced Micro Devices, Nvidia, Qualcomm, and Google. He also helps lead Stanford's Quantum Fundamentals, ARchitectures and Machines initiative (Q-FARM) which aims to harness the expertise and facilities of Stanford University and the SLAC National Accelerator Laboratory to accelerate the development of quantum information science.

== Business ==
In 1990 Horowitz took a leave of absence from Stanford to work with Mike Farmwald on a new high-bandwidth DRAM design which, in April of that year, led to the formation of Rambus Inc., a company specializing in high-bandwidth memory technology. After working at Rambus for a year, he returned to Stanford and started a research program in high-speed input/output. Video game machines were early adopters of this technology, with Nintendo 64 and PlayStation 2 the first two mass-produced products to use the company's DRAMs. Intel later adopted the company's RDRAM processor interface, and Rambus memory chips were used in PCs in the late 1990s. Horowitz returned briefly to Rambus in 2005 to help start a research organization at the company and left the board of directors in 2011.

== Awards and honors ==
- IEEE Donald O. Pederson Award in Solid-State Circuits (2006)
- Member, National Academy of Engineering (inducted 2007)
- Fellow, American Academy of Arts and Sciences (elected 2008)
- SIA University Research Award (2011)
- Fellow, IEEE
- Fellow, Association for Computing Machinery
- Best Paper Award, ISQED (2005)
- Jack Kilby Outstanding Paper Award, ISSCC (2003)
- Most influential paper, International Symposium on Computer Architecture (1994)
- Most Influential Paper, International Symposium on Computer Architecture (1989)
- ChipEx Global Leadership Award (2015)
- ACM - IEEE CS Eckert–Mauchly Award (2022)

== Publications ==
=== Books ===
- J. Acken, A. Agarwal, G. Gulak, M. Horowitz, S. McFarling, S. Richardson, A. Salz, R. Simoni, D. Stark, and S. Tjiang, The MIPS-X RISC Microprocessor. Kluwer Academic Publishers, Boston, MA, 1989. Foreword by J.L. Hennessy.
- S. Bell, J. Pu, J. Hagerty, M. Horowitz, Compiling Algorithms for Heterogeneous Systems, Morgan & Claypool Publishers, 2018.

=== Book chapters ===
- Multithreaded Computer Architectures, chapter 8 – "Architectural and Implementation Tradeoffs in the Design of Multiple-Context Processors", Kluwer Academic Publishers, 1994.
- Design of High-Performance Microprocessor Circuits, "High-Speed Electrical Signaling", 2001.
- Power Aware Design Methodologies, chapter 8 – "Energy-Efficient Design of High-Speed Links", Kluwer Academic Publishers, 2002.
- Computational Imaging and Vision, Chapter 7 – "Synthetic Aperture Focusing using Dense Camera Arrays", Volume 35, 2007, pp. 159–172.
- Methods in Enzymology, Chapter 13 – "Alignment of Cryo-Electron Tomography Datasets", Elsevier, 2010, pp. 343–367.

=== Select Patents ===
- Gary B. Bronner, Brent S. Haukness, Mark A. Horowitz, Mark D. Kellam, Fariborz Assaderaghi. "United States Patent 11,244,727 Dynamic memory rank configuration", Rambus Inc, Feb 8, 2022
- Vladimir M Stojanovic, Andrew C Ho, Anthony Bessios, Bruno W Garlepp, Grace Tsang, Mark A Horowitz, Jared L Zerbe, Jason C Wei. "United States Patent 16/999,853 Partial response receiver", Rambus Inc, Mar 11, 2021
- Craig Hampel, Mark Horowitz. "United States Patent 17/000,130 System including hierarchical memory modules having different types of integrated circuit memory devices", Rambus Inc, Feb 4, 2021
- Mark Alan Horowitz, Ilias Pappas, Edward Buckley, William Thomas Blank. "United States Patent 10,861,380 Display systems with hybrid emitter circuits", Facebook Technologies LLC, Dec 8, 2020
- Haw-Jyh Liaw, Xingchao Yuan, Mark A Horowitz. "United States Patent 10,782,344 Technique for determining performance characteristics of electronic devices and systems", Rambus Inc, Sep 22, 2020
- Vladimir M Stojanovic, Andrew C Ho, Anthony Bessios, Fred F Chen, Elad Alon, Mark A Horowitz. "United States Patent 10,771,295 High speed signaling system with adaptive transmit pre-emphasis", Rambus Inc, Sep 8, 2020
- Vladimir M Stojanovic, Andrew C Ho, Anthony Bessios, Bruno W Garlepp, Grace Tsang, Mark A Horowitz, Jared L Zerbe, Jason C Wei. "United States Patent 10,764,094 Partial response receiver", Rambus Inc, Sep 1, 2020
- Craig Hampel, Mark Horowitz. "United States Patent 10,755,794 System including hierarchical memory modules having different types of integrated circuit memory devices", Rambus Inc, Aug 25, 2020
- Ely K Tsern, Mark A Horowitz, Frederick A Ware. "United States Patent 16/805,619 Memory Controller With Error Detection And Retry Modes Of Operation", Rambus Inc, Aug 20, 2020
- Ely K Tsern, Mark A Horowitz, Frederick A Ware. "United States Patent 10,621,023 Memory controller with error detection and retry modes of operation", Rambus Inc, Apr 14, 2020
- Vladimir M Stojanovic, Andrew C Ho, Anthony Bessios, Fred F Chen, Elad Alon, Mark A Horowitz. "United States Patent 10,411,923 High speed signaling system with adaptive transmit pre-emphasis", Rambus Inc, Sep 10, 2019
- Mark A Horowitz, Craig E Hampel, Alfredo Moncayo, Kevin S Donnelly, Jared L Zerbe. "United States Patent 10,366,045 Flash controller to provide a value that represents a parameter to a flash memory Inventors", Rambus Inc, Jul 30, 2019
- Noy Cohen, Marc S Levoy, Michael J Broxton, Logan Grosenick, Samuel Yang, Aaron Andalman, Karl A Disseroth, Mark A Horowitz. "United States Patent 10,317,597 Light-field microscopy with phase masking", Leland Stanford Junior University, Jun 11, 2019
- Jared LeVan Zerbe, Kevin S Donnelly, Stefanos Sidiropoulos, Donald C Stark, Mark A Horowitz, Leung Yu, Roxanne Vu, Jun Kim, Bruno W Garlepp, Tsyr-Chyang Ho, Benedict Chung-Kwong Lau. "United States Patent 10,310,999 Flash memory controller with calibrated data communication", Rambus Inc, Jun 4, 2019
- Jared L Zerbe, Bruno W Garlepp, Pak S Chau, Kevin S Donnelly, Mark A Horowitz, Stefanos Sidiropoulos, Billy W Garrett Jr, Carl W Werner. "United States Patent 9,998,305 Multi-PAM output driver with distortion compensation", Rambus Inc, Jun 12, 2018
- Haw-Jyh Liaw, Xingchao Yuan, Mark A Horowitz. "United States Patent 9,977,076 Technique for determining performance characteristics of electronic devices and systems", Rambus Inc, May 22, 2018
- Vladimir M Stojanovic, Andrew C Ho, Anthony Bessios, Bruno W Garlepp, Grace Tsang, Mark A Horowitz, Jared L Zerbe, Jason C Wei. "United States Patent 9,917,708 Partial response receiver", Rambus Inc, Mar 6, 2018
