= XDR DRAM =

Type of random-access memory

XDR DRAM.

XDR DRAM (extreme data rate dynamic random-access memory) is a high-performance dynamic random-access memory interface. It is based on and succeeds RDRAM. Competing technologies include DDR2 and GDDR4.

== Overview ==
XDR was designed to be effective in small, high-bandwidth consumer systems, high-performance memory applications, and high-end GPUs. It eliminates the unusually high latency problems that plagued early forms of RDRAM. Also, XDR DRAM has heavy emphasis on per-pin bandwidth, which can benefit further cost control on PCB production. This is because fewer lanes are needed for the same amount of bandwidth. Rambus owns the rights to the technology. XDR is used by Sony in the PlayStation 3 console.

== Technical specifications ==
=== Performance ===
- Initial clock rate at 400 MHz.
- Octal data rate (ODR): Eight bits per clock cycle per lane.
- Each chip provides 8, 16, or 32 programmable lanes, providing up to 230.4 Gbit/s (28.8 GB/s) at 900 MHz (7.2 GHz effective).

=== Features ===
- Bi-directional differential Rambus Signalling Levels (DRSL)
  - This uses differential open-collector driver, voltage swing 0.2V. It is not the same as LVDS.
- Programmable on-chip termination
- Adaptive impedance matching
- Eight bank memory architecture
- Up to four bank-interleaved transactions at full bandwidth
- Point-to-point data interconnect
- Chip scale package packaging
- Dynamic request scheduling
- Early-read-after-write support for maximum efficiency
- Zero overhead refresh

=== Power requirements ===
- 1.8 V Vdd
- Programmable ultra-low-voltage DRSL 200 mV swing
- Low-power PLL/DLL design
- Power-down self-refresh support
- Dynamic data width support with dynamic clock gating
- Per-pin I/O power-down
- Sub-page activation support

=== Ease of system design ===
- Per-bit FlexPhase circuits compensate to a 2.5 ps resolution
- XDR Interconnect uses minimum pin count

=== Latency ===
- 1.25/2.0/2.5/3.33 ns request packets

== Protocol ==
An XDR RAM chip's high-speed signals are a differential clock input (clock from master, CFM/CFMN), a 12-bit single-ended request/command bus (RQ11..0), and a bidirectional differential data bus up to 16 bits wide (DQ15..0/DQN15..0). The request bus may be connected to several memory chips in parallel, but the data bus is point to point; only one RAM chip may be connected to it. To support different amounts of memory with a fixed-width memory controller, the chips have a programmable interface width. A 32-bit-wide DRAM controller may support 2 16-bit chips, or be connected to 4 memory chips each of which supplies 8 bits of data, or up to 16 chips configured with 2-bit interfaces.

In addition, each chip has a low-speed serial bus used to determine its capabilities and configure its interface. This consists of three shared inputs: a reset line (RST), a serial command input (CMD) and a serial clock (SCK), and serial data in/out lines (SDI and SDO) that are daisy-chained together and eventually connect to a single pin on the memory controller.

All single-ended lines are active-low; an asserted signal or logical 1 is represented by a low voltage.

The request bus operates at double data rate relative to the clock input. Two consecutive 12-bit transfers (beginning with the falling edge of CFM) make a 24-bit command packet.

The data bus operates at 8x the speed of the clock; a 400 MHz clock generates 3200 MT/s. All data reads and writes operate in 16-transfer bursts lasting 2 clock cycles.

Request packet formats are as follows:

XDR DRAM request packet formats
Clock edge	Bit	NOP	Column read/write		Calibrate/power-down		Precharge/refresh		Row Activate		Masked write	
Clock edge	Bit	Bit	Bit	Description	Bit	Description	Bit	Description	Bit	Description	Bit	Description
↓	RQ11	0	0	COL opcode	0	COLX opcode	0	ROWP opcode	0	ROWA opcode	1	COLM opcode
↓	RQ10	0	0	COL opcode	0	COLX opcode	0	ROWP opcode	1	ROWA opcode	M3	Write mask low bits
↓	RQ9	0	0	COL opcode	1	COLX opcode	1	ROWP opcode	R9	Row address high bits	M2	Write mask low bits
↓	RQ8	0	1	COL opcode	0	COLX opcode	1	ROWP opcode	R10	Row address high bits	M1	Write mask low bits
↓	RQ7	x	WRX	Write/Read bit	x	reserved	POP1	Precharge delay (0–3)	R11	Row address high bits	M0	Write mask low bits
↓	RQ6	x	C8	Column address high bits	x	reserved	POP0	Precharge delay (0–3)	R12	reserved	C8	Column address high bits
↓	RQ5	x	C9	Column address high bits	x	reserved	x	reserved	R13	reserved	C9	Column address high bits
↓	RQ4	x	C10	reserved	x	reserved	x	reserved	R14	reserved	C10	reserved
↓	RQ3	x	C11	reserved	XOP3	Subopcode	x	reserved	R15	reserved	C11	reserved
↓	RQ2	x	BC2	Bank address	XOP2	Subopcode	BP2	Precharge bank	BA2	Bank address	BC2	Bank address
↓	RQ1	x	BC1	Bank address	XOP1	Subopcode	BP1	Precharge bank	BA1	Bank address	BC1	Bank address
↓	RQ0	x	BC0	Bank address	XOP0	Subopcode	BP0	Precharge bank	BA0	Bank address	BC0	Bank address
↑	RQ11	x	DELC	Command delay (0–1)	x	reserved	POP2	Precharge enable	DELA	Command delay (0–1)	M7	Write mask high bits
↑	RQ10	x	x	reserved	x	reserved	ROP2	Refresh command	R8	Row address low bits	M6	Write mask high bits
↑	RQ9	x	x	reserved	x	reserved	ROP1	Refresh command	R7	Row address low bits	M5	Write mask high bits
↑	RQ8	x	x	reserved	x	reserved	ROP0	Refresh command	R6	Row address low bits	M4	Write mask high bits
↑	RQ7	x	C7	Column address low bits	x	reserved	DELR1	Refresh delay (0–3)	R5	Row address low bits	C7	Column address low bits
↑	RQ6	x	C6	Column address low bits	x	reserved	DELR0	Refresh delay (0–3)	R4	Row address low bits	C6	Column address low bits
↑	RQ5	x	C5	Column address low bits	x	reserved	x	reserved	R3	Row address low bits	C5	Column address low bits
↑	RQ4	x	C4	Column address low bits	x	reserved	x	reserved	R2	Row address low bits	C4	Column address low bits
↑	RQ3	x	SC3	Sub-column address	x	reserved	x	reserved	R1	Row address low bits	SC3	Sub-column address
↑	RQ2	x	SC2	Sub-column address	x	reserved	BR2	Refresh bank	R0	Row address low bits	SC2	Sub-column address
↑	RQ1	x	SC1	Sub-column address	x	reserved	BR1	Refresh bank	SR1	Sub-row address	SC1	Sub-column address
↑	RQ0	x	SC0	Sub-column address	x	reserved	BR0	Refresh bank	SR0	Sub-row address	SC0	Sub-column address

There are a large number of timing constraints giving minimum times that must elapse between various commands (see Dynamic random-access memory § Memory timing); the DRAM controller sending them must ensure they are all met.

Some commands contain delay fields; these delay the effect of that command by the given number of clock cycles. This permits multiple commands (to different banks) to take effect on the same clock cycle.

=== Row activate command ===
This operates equivalently to standard SDRAM's activate command, specifying a row address to be loaded into the bank's sense amplifier array. To save power, a chip may be configured to only activate a portion of the sense amplifier array. In this case, the SR1..0 bits specify the half or quarter of the row to activate, and following read/write commands' column addresses are required to be limited to that portion. (Refresh operations always use the full row.)

=== Read/write commands ===
These operate analogously to a standard SDRAM's read or write commands, specifying a column address. Data is provided to the chip a few cycles after a write command (typically 3), and is output by the chip several cycles after a read command (typically 6). Just as with other forms of SDRAM, the DRAM controller is responsible for ensuring that the data bus is not scheduled for use in both directions at the same time. Data is always transferred in 16-transfer bursts, lasting 2 clock cycles. Thus, for a ×16 device, 256 bits (32 bytes) are transferred per burst.

If the chip is using a data bus less than 16 bits wide, one or more of the sub-column address bits are used to select the portion of the column to be presented on the data bus. If the data bus is 8 bits wide, SC3 is used to identify which half of the read data to access; if the data bus is 4 bits wide, SC3 and SC2 are used, etc.

Unlike conventional SDRAM, there is no provision for choosing the order in which the data is supplied within a burst. Thus, it is not possible to perform critical-word-first reads.

==== Masked write command ====
The masked write command is similar to a normal write, but no command delay is permitted and a mask byte is supplied. This permits controlling which 8-bit fields are written. This is not a bitmap indicating which bytes are to be written; it would not be large enough for the 32 bytes in a write burst. Rather, it is a bit pattern which the DRAM controller fills unwritten bytes with. The DRAM controller is responsible for finding a pattern which does not appear in the other bytes that are to be written. Because there are 256 possible patterns and only 32 bytes in the burst, it is straightforward to find one. Even when multiple devices are connected in parallel, a mask byte can always be found when the bus is at most 128 bits wide. (This would produce 256 bytes per burst, but a masked write command is only used if at least one of them is not to be written.)

Each byte is the 8 consecutive bits transferred across one data line during a particular clock cycle. M0 is matched to the first data bit transferred during a clock cycle, and M7 is matched to the last bit.

This convention also interferes with performing critical-word-first reads; any word must include bits from at least the first 8 bits transferred.

=== Precharge/refresh command ===
This command is similar to a combination of a conventional SDRAM's precharge and refresh commands. The POPx and BPx bits specify a precharge operation, while the ROPx, DELRx, and BRx bits specify a refresh operation. Each may be separately enabled. If enabled, each may have a different command delay and must be addressed to a different bank.

Precharge commands may only be sent to one bank at a time; unlike a conventional SDRAM, there is no "precharge all banks" command.

Refresh commands are also different from a conventional SDRAM. There is no "refresh all banks" command, and the refresh operation is divided into separate activate and precharge operations so the timing is determined by the memory controller. The refresh counter is also programmable by the controller. Operations are:

- 000: NOPR Perform no refresh operation
- 001: REFP Refresh precharge; end the refresh operation on the selected bank.
- 010: REFA Refresh activate; activate the row selected by the REFH/M/L register and selected bank for refresh.
- 011: REFI Refresh & increment; as for REFA, but also increment the REFH/M/L register.
- 100: LRR0 Load refresh register low; copy RQ7–0 to the low 8 bits of the refresh counter REFL. No command delay.
- 101: LRR1 Load refresh register middle; copy RQ7–0 to the middle 8 bits of the refresh counter REFM. No command delay.
- 110: LRR2 Load refresh register high; copy RQ7–0 to the high 8 bits of the refresh counter REFH (if implemented). No command delay.
- 111 reserved

=== Calibrate/powerdown command ===
This command performs a number of miscellaneous functions, as determined by the XOPx field. Although there are 16 possibilities, only 4 are actually used. Three subcommands start and stop output driver calibration (which must be performed periodically, every 100 ms).

The fourth subcommand places the chip in power-down mode. In this mode, it performs internal refresh and ignores the high-speed data lines. It must be woken up using the low-speed serial bus.

== Low-speed serial bus ==
XDR DRAMs are probed and configured using a low-speed serial bus. The RST, SCK, and CMD signals are driven by the controller to every chip in parallel. The SDI and SDO lines are daisy-chained together, with the last SDO output connected to the controller, and the first SDI input tied high (logic 0).

On reset, each chip drives its SDO pin low (1). When reset is released, a series of SCK pulses are sent to the chips. Each chip drives its SDO output high (0) one cycle after seeing its SDI input high (0). Further, it counts the number of cycles that elapse between releasing reset and seeing its SDI input high, and copies that count to an internal chip ID register. Commands sent by the controller over the CMD line include an address which must match the chip ID field.

=== General structure of commands ===
Each command either reads or writes a single 8-bit register, using an 8-bit address. This allows up to 256 registers, but only the range 1–31 is currently assigned.

Normally, the CMD line is left high (logic 0) and SCK pulses have no effect. To send a command, a sequence of 32 bits is clocked out over the CMD lines:

- 4 bits of 1100, a command start signal.
- A read/write bit. If 0, this is a read, if 1 this is a write.
- A single/broadcast bit. If 0, only the device with the matching ID is selected. If 1, all devices execute the command.
- 6 bits of serial device ID. Device IDs are automatically assigned, starting with 0, on device reset.
- 8 bits of register address
- A single bit of "0". This provides time to process read requests, and enable the SDO output in case of a read,
- 8 bits of data. If this is a read command, the bits provided must be 0, and the register's value is produced on the SDO pin of the selected chip. All non-selected chips connect their SDI inputs to their SDO outputs, so the controller will see the value.
- A single bit of "0". This ends the command and provides time to disable the SDO output.

== See also ==
- RDRAM
- XDR2 DRAM
- List of device bandwidths
