= Quad-channel architecture =

Quad-channel computer memory is a memory bus technology used by AMD Socket G34 released in May 2010, with Opteron 6100-series "Magny-Cours" (45 nm) and later by the Intel X79 chipset released in November 2011, for LGA2011-based Core i7 CPUs utilizing the Sandy Bridge microarchitecture. It is the successor of the triple-channel architecture used by the Intel X58 chipset for LGA1366-based CPUs.

== See also ==
- Multi-channel memory architecture
