= AMD FirePro =

Brand by AMD

- Design firm: Advanced Micro Devices
- Type: Professional workstations

AMD FirePro was AMD's brand of graphics cards designed for use in workstations and servers running professional Computer-aided design (CAD), Computer-generated imagery (CGI), Digital content creation (DCC), and High-performance computing/GPGPU applications. The GPU chips on FirePro-branded graphics cards are identical to the ones used on Radeon-branded graphics cards. The end products (i.e. the graphics card) differentiate substantially by the provided graphics device drivers and through the available professional support for the software. The product line is split into two categories: "W" workstation series focusing on workstation and primarily focusing on graphics and display, and "S" server series focused on virtualization and GPGPU/High-performance computing.

The release of the Radeon Pro Duo in April 2016 and the announcement of the Radeon Pro WX Series in July 2016 marked the succession of Radeon Pro as AMD's professional workstation graphics card solution. Radeon Instinct is the current brand for servers.

Competitors included Nvidia's Quadro-branded and to an extent, Nvidia Tesla-branded product series and Intel's Xeon Phi-branded products.

== History ==
The FireGL line was originally developed by the German company Spea Software AG until it was acquired by Diamond Multimedia in November 1995. The first FireGL board used the 3Dlabs GLINT 3D processor chip.

Deprecated brand names are ATI FireGL, ATI FirePro 3D, and AMD FireStream.

In July 2016, AMD announced it would be replacing the FirePro brand with Radeon Pro for workstations. The new brand for servers is Radeon Instinct.

== Features ==
=== Multi-monitor support ===
AMD Eyefinity can support multi-monitor set-ups. One graphics card can drive up to a maximum of six monitors; the supported number depends on the distinct product and the number of DisplayPort displays. The device driver facilitates the configuration of diverse display group modes.

=== Differences with the Radeon Line ===
The user-mode drivers as well as the kernel-mode drivers for AMD FirePro products have additional features, and also (not depicted here) additional interfaces.

The FirePro line is designed for compute intensive, multimedia content creation (such as video editors), and mechanical engineering design software (such as CAD programs). Their Radeon counterparts are suited towards video games and other consumer applications. Because they use the same drivers (Catalyst) and are based on the same architectures and chipsets, the major differences are essentially limited to price and double-precision performance. However, some FirePro cards may have major feature differences to the equivalent Radeon card, such as ECC RAM and differing physical display outputs.

Since the 2007 series, high-end and ultra-end FireGL/FirePro products (based on the R600 architecture) have officially implemented stream processing. The Radeon line of video cards, although present in hardware, did not offer any support for stream processing until the HD 4000 series where beta level OpenCL 1.0 support is offered, and the HD 5000 series and later, where full OpenCL 1.1 support is offered.

=== Heterogeneous System Architecture ===
HSA is intended to facilitate the programming for stream processing and/or GPGPU in combination with CPUs and DSPs. All models implementing the Graphics Core Next microarchitecture support hardware features defined by the HSA Foundation and AMD has provided corresponding software.

=== FirePro DirectGMA ===
AMD DirectGMA is a feature usable with AMD FirePro products.

- GPUOpen: Professional Compute is no longer on GPUOpen

=== Soft-mods ===
Because of the similarities between FireGL and Radeon cards, some users soft-mod their Radeon cards by using third-party software or automated scripts accompanied by a modified FireGL driver patch, to allow FireGL capabilities for their hardware, effectively getting a cheaper, equivalent, FireGL card, often with better OpenGL capabilities, but usually half of the amount of video memory. Some variants can also be soft-modded to a FireStream stream processor.

The trend of soft-mods was continued with the 2007 series FireGL cards, as follows:

Radeon product	GPU	Corresponding FireGL soft-mod
Radeon HD 2900 XT (1 GB GDDR4 version)	R600 XT	FireGL V8600
Radeon HD 2900 GT	R600 GT	FireGL V7600
Radeon HD 2600 XT (512 MB GDDR4 version)	RV630 XT	FireGL V5600
Radeon HD 2600 Pro	RV630 Pro	FireGL V3600
Radeon HD 3850/3870	RV670	FireGL V7700^{1} / FireStream 9170
Radeon HD 4870	RV770	FirePro V8700
*^{1} Radeon HD 3850/3870 products do not have the DisplayPort output presented on FireGL V7700 product.

== Products ==
=== Workstation ===
==== Pre-ATI FireGL cards ====
Year	Manufacturer	Model	Chipset	Memory (RAM)	Bus Type
1995	SPEA	FireGL	3Dlabs GLINT 300SX + S3 86C968/86c868	8 MB VRAM + 8-12 MB DRAM	PCI
1997	Diamond	FireGL 1000	3DLabs Permedia + GLint Delta	4/8 MB	PCI
1997	Diamond	FireGL 1000 Pro	3DLabs Permedia 2	4/8 MB	AGP 2X
1996	Diamond	FireGL 2000	3Dlabs GLINT 300SX + S3 86C968/86c868	8 MB VRAM + 8-12 MB DRAM	PCI
1997	Diamond	FireGL 3000	3Dlabs Glint 500TX + Glint Delta + ALG2564	8 MB VRAM + 8/16/32 MB	PCI
1997	Diamond	FireGL 4000	Mitsubishi 3Dpro/2MP + CL-GD5446	15 MB 3D RAM/ 4-16 MB CDRAM	PCI
1998	Diamond	FireGL 5000	Evans & Sutherland RealImage 2100 + Mitsubishi iMPAC-GE		
2000	Diamond	FireGL 1	IBM Oasis Rasterizer (100 MHz)	32 MB SGR (100 MHz)	AGP 2x
2000	Diamond	FireGL 2	IBM RC1000 (120 MHz) + GT1000 (190 MHz)	64 MB DDR (120 MHz)	AGP 4x
2001	Diamond	FireGL 3	IBM RC1000 (120 MHz) + GT1000 (190 MHz)	128 MB DDR (120 MHz)	AGP 4x Pro
2001	Diamond	FireGL 4	IBM RC1000 (150 MHz) + GT1000 (205 MHz)	128 MB DDR (150 MHz)	AGP 4x Pro

==== FireGL Series ====
Model	Launch	Micro-archi-tecture	Core	Fab (nm)	Bus interface	Core clock (MHz)	Memory clock (MHz)	Core config	Fillrate		Memory				Processing power (GFLOPS)	API compliance (version)			Notes
Model	Launch	Micro-archi-tecture	Core	Fab (nm)	Bus interface	Core clock (MHz)	Memory clock (MHz)	Core config	Pixel (GP/s)	Texture (GT/s)	Size (MB)	Bandwidth (GB/s)	Bus type	Bus width (bit)	Single precision	Direct3D	OpenGL	Vulkan	Notes
FireGL 8700	2001	R200	Radeon 8500	150	AGP	250	270	2:4:8:4^{1}	1	2	64	8.64	DDR	64 × 2	Unknown	8.1	1.4	—N/a	
FireGL 8800	2001	R200	Radeon 8500	150	AGP	300	290	2:4:8:4^{1}	1.2	2.4	128	9.28	DDR	64 × 2	Unknown	8.1	1.4	—N/a	
FireGL T2-64	2003	R300	Radeon 9600 Pro	130	AGP	325	200	2:4:4:4^{1}	1.3	1.3	64	6.4	DDR	128	Unknown	9.0	2.0	—N/a	
FireGL T2-128	2003	R300	Radeon 9600 Pro	130	AGP	400	320	2:4:4:4^{1}	1.6	1.6	128	10.2	DDR	128	Unknown	9.0	2.0	—N/a	
FireGL Z1-128	2002	R300	Radeon 9500 Pro	150	AGP	325	310	4:4:4:4^{1}	1.3	1.3	128	19.8	DDR	256	Unknown	9.0	2.0	—N/a	
FireGL X1-128	2002	R300	Radeon 9700	150	AGP	325	310	4:8:8:8^{1}	2.6	2.6	128	19.84	DDR	256	Unknown	9.0	2.0	—N/a	
FireGL X1-256	2002	R300	Radeon 9700 Pro	150	AGP Pro	325	310	4:8:8:8^{1}	2.6	2.6	256	19.84	DDR	256	Unknown	9.0	2.0	—N/a	
FireGL X2-256	2003	R300	Radeon 9800 Pro	150	AGP	380	350	4:8:8:8^{1}	3.04	3.04	256	22.4	DDR2	256	Unknown	9.0	2.0	—N/a	
FireGL X2-256T	2003	R300	Radeon 9800 XT	150	AGP	412	344	4:8:8:8^{1}	3.3	3.3	256	22.0	DDR2	256	Unknown	9.0	2.0	—N/a	
FireGL X3-256	2004	R300	Radeon X800 XT	130	AGP	450	450	6:12:12:12^{1}	5.4	5.4	256	28.8	GDDR3	256	Unknown	9.0b	2.0	—N/a	
FireGL V3100	2005	R300	Radeon X300 XT	110	PCIe x16	400	200	2:4:4:4^{1}	1.6	1.6	128	6.4	DDR	128	Unknown	9.0	2.0	—N/a	
FireGL V3200	2005	R300	Radeon X600 XT	130	PCIe x16	500	400	2:4:4:4^{1}	2	2	128	12.8	DDR2	128	Unknown	9.0b	2.0	—N/a	
FireGL V3300	2006	R500	Radeon 1300 Pro	90	PCIe x16	600	400	2:4:4:4^{1}	2.4	2.4	128	6.4	GDDR2	64	Unknown	9.0c	2.0	—N/a	
FireGL V3350	2006	R500	Radeon 1300 Pro	90	PCIe x16	600	400	2:4:4:4^{1}	2.4	2.4	256	6.4	GDDR2	64	Unknown	9.0c	2.0	—N/a	
FireGL V3400	2006	R500	Radeon 1600 Pro/XT	90	PCIe x16	500	500	5:12:4:4^{1}	2	2	128	16	GDDR3	128	Unknown	9.0c	2.0	—N/a	
FireGL V3600	2007	Tera-Scale 1	RV630 GL, HD 2600 Pro	65	PCIe x16	600	500	120^{2}(24×5):8:4:3	2.4	4.8	256	16.0	GDDR3	128	144	10	3.3	—N/a	Shader Model 4.0, APP Stream
FireGL V5000	2005	R400	Radeon X700 Pro/XT	130	PCIe x16	425	430	6:8:8:8^{1}	3.4	3.4	128	13.6	GDDR3	128	Unknown	9.0b	2.0	—N/a	
FireGL V5100	2005	R400	Radeon X800 Pro	130	PCIe x16	450	350	6:12:12:12^{1}	5.4	5.4	128	22.4	DDR	256	Unknown	9.0b	2.0	—N/a	
FireGL V5200	2005	R500	Radeon X1600 XT	90	PCIe x16	600	700	5:12:4:4^{1}	2.4	2.4	256	22.4	GDDR3	128	Unknown	9.0c	2.0	—N/a	
FireGL V5600	2007	Tera-Scale 1	R630 GL, HD 2600 XT	65	PCIe	800	1100	120^{2}(24×5):8:4:3	3.2	6.4	512	35.2	GDDR4	128	192	10	3.3	—N/a	Shader Model 4.0, APP Stream
FireGL V7100	2005	R400	Radeon X800 XT	130	PCIe	500	450	6:16:16:16^{1}	8	8	256	28.8	GDDR3	256	Unknown	9.0c	2.0	—N/a	
FireGL V7200	2006	R500	Radeon X1800 XT	90	PCIe x16	600	650	8:16:16:16^{1}	9.6	9.6	256	41.6	GDDR3	256	Unknown	9.0c	2.0	—N/a	
FireGL V7300	2006	R500	R520 GL, X1800 XT	90	PCIe	600	650	8:16:16:16^{1}	9.6	9.6	512	41.6	GDDR3	256	Unknown	9.0c	2.0	—N/a	
FireGL V7350	2006	R500	R520 GL, X1800 XT	90	PCIe	600	650	8:16:16:16^{1}	9.6	9.6	1024	41.6	GDDR3	256	Unknown	9.0c	2.0	—N/a	
FireGL V7400	2006 (Canceled)	R500	Radeon X1950 Pro	80	PCIe	550?	650?	8:36:16:16^{1}	19.8?	19.8?	512?	41.6?	GDDR3	256	Unknown	9.0c	2.0	—N/a	never released, superseded by 2007 Series
FireGL V7600	2007	Tera-Scale 1	R600 GL, HD 2900 GT	80	PCIe	600	800	240^{2}(48×5):12:12:3	9.6	9.6	512	51.2	GDDR3	256	288	10	3.3	—N/a	Shader Model 4.0, APP Stream
FireGL V7700	2007 (2008)	Tera-Scale 1	R670 GL, HD 3870	55	PCIe 2.0	775	1125	320^{2}(64×5):16:16:4	12.4	12.4	512	72	GDDR4	256	496	10.1 (SM4.1)	3.3	—N/a	DisplayPort. Can do double precision computation via the AMD Stream SDK.
FireGL V8600	2007	Tera-Scale 1	R600 GL, HD 2900 XT	80	PCIe	688	868	320^{2}(64×5):16:16:4	11.008	11.008	1024	111.1	GDDR4	512	440.32	10	3.3	—N/a	Shader Model 4.0, APP Stream
FireGL V8650	2007	Tera-Scale 1	R600 GL, HD 2900 XT	80	PCIe	688	868	320^{2}(64×5):16:16:4	11.008	11.008	2048	111.1	GDDR4	512	440.32	10	3.3	—N/a	Shader Model 4.0, APP Stream

^{1} Vertex shaders : Pixel shaders : Texture mapping units : Render output units
^{2} Unified shaders : Texture mapping units : Render output units : Compute Units

==== FireMV (Multi-View) Series ====
Model	Launch	Core	Bus interface	Core clock (MHz)	Memory clock (MHz)	Core config^{1}	Fillrate (GT/s)	Memory				API compliance (version)		TDP / idle (watts)	Notes
Model	Launch	Core	Bus interface	Core clock (MHz)	Memory clock (MHz)	Core config^{1}	Fillrate (GT/s)	Size (MB)	Bandwidth (GB/s)	Bus type	Bus width (bit)	Direct3D	OpenGL	TDP / idle (watts)	Notes
FireMV 2200 PCI.	Jan 2006	RV280 GL	PCI	240	200	1:4:4:4	0.96	64	3.2	DDR	64	8.1	1.4	15	DMS-59 for dual DVI-D output
FireMV 2200 PCIe.	Jan 2006	RV370	PCIe x16	324	196	2:4:4:4	1.296	128	3.2	DDR	64	9.0	2.1	15	DMS-59 for dual DVI-D output
FireMV 2260	Jan 2008	RV620	PCIe 2.0 x1/x16, PCI	600	500	40(8×5):4:4	2.4	256	32	DDR2	256	10.1	3.3	15/8	Dual DisplayPort (with adapters: DVI-D)
FireMV 2400 PCI.	Jan 2008	RV380 x2	PCI	500	500	2:4:4:4	2.0	128	16	DDR	128	9.0b	2.1	20	2x VHDCI for quad DVI-D output, VGA
FireMV 2400 PCIe.	Jan 2008	RV380 x2	PCIe x1	500	500	2:4:4:4	2.0	256	16	DDR3	128	9.0b	2.1	20	2x VHDCI for quad DVI-D output, VGA

^{1} Vertex shaders : Pixel shaders : Texture mapping unit : Render output units
^{2} Unified shaders : Texture mapping unit : Render output units

==== FirePro (Multi-View) Series ====
Model	Launch	Core	Fab (nm)	Transistors (million)	Die size (mm^{2})	Bus interface	Core clock (MHz)	Memory clock (MHz)	Core config^{1}	Fillrate		Memory				API compliance (version)		TDP / idle (watts)	Notes
Model	Launch	Core	Fab (nm)	Transistors (million)	Die size (mm^{2})	Bus interface	Core clock (MHz)	Memory clock (MHz)	Core config^{1}	Pixel (GP/s)	Texture (GT/s)	Size (MB)	Bandwidth (GB/s)	Bus type	Bus width (bit)	Direct3D	OpenGL (OpenCL)	TDP / idle (watts)	Notes
FirePro 2250	2007-01-01	RV516	80	107	100	PCIe x1/x16	600	500	2:4:4:4	2.4	0.3	256	32	DDR2	256	9.0c	2.1 (no)	20/11	DMS-59 for dual DVI-D output
FirePro 2270	2011-01-31	Cedar GL (RV810)	40	292	59	PCIe 2.1 x1/x16	600	600	80(16×5):8:4:1	2.4	4.8	512; 1024	9.6	GDDR3	64	11.0	4.3 (1.2)	15/8; 17/8	DMS-59 for dual output: DP or DVI-I or D-sub
FirePro 2450 Multi-View	2009-01-01	2x RV620 (Terascale 1)	55	2x 181	2x 61	PCIe 2.0 x1/x16	600	600	2x 40(8×5):4:4:1	2.4	4.8	512	38.4	GDDR3	256	10.1	3.3 (APP)	36/18	2x VHDCI for quad output: DVI-I or D-sub
FirePro 2460 Multi-View,	2010-04-01	Cedar GL (RV810) (Tera-scale2)	40	292	59	PCIe 2.1 x16	500	500	80(16×5):8:4:1	2.0	4.0	512	32	GDDR5	64	11.0	4.3 (1.2)	17/13	4x Mini DP for quad output: DP or DVI-D, UVD2, PowerPlay, Eyefinity

==== FirePro 3D Series (V000) ====
Model	Launch	Micro-archi-tecture	Code name	Fab (nm)	Transistors (million)	Die size (mm^{2})	Bus interface	Clock rate		Core config^{1}	Fillrate		Memory				Processing power (GFLOPS)		API compliance (version)				TDP (Watts)	Notes
Model	Launch	Micro-archi-tecture	Code name	Fab (nm)	Transistors (million)	Die size (mm^{2})	Bus interface	Core (MHz)	Memory (MHz)	Core config^{1}	Pixel (GP/s)	Texture (GT/s)	Size (MB)	Bandwidth (GB/s)	Bus type	Bus width (bit)	Single precision	Double precision	Direct3D	OpenGL	OpenCL	Vulkan	TDP (Watts)	Notes
FirePro 3D V3700	August 8, 2008	Terascale 1	RV620 PRO	55	181	67	PCIe 2.0 x16	800	950	40(8×5):4:4:2	3.2	3.2	256	15.2	GDDR3	64	64	-	10.1	3.3 SM4.1	APP Stream only	—N/a	32	UVD+, PowerPlay
FirePro 3D V3750	September 11, 2008	Terascale 1	RV730 PRO	55	514	146	PCIe 2.0 x16	550	750	320(64×5):32:8:4	4.4	17.6	256	24	GDDR3	128	352	-	10.1	3.3	1.0	—N/a	48	UVD2, PowerPlay
FirePro 3D V3800,	April 26, 2010	TeraScale 2	Redwood Pro GL (RV830)	40	627	104	PCIe 2.1 x16	650	900	400(80×5):20:8:5	5.2	13	512	14.4	GDDR3	64	520	?	11.0	4.3 SM5.0	1.2	—N/a	43	UVD2, PowerPlay, Eyefinity
FirePro 3D V4800,	April 26, 2010	TeraScale 2	Redwood XT GL (RV830)	40	672	104	PCIe 2.1 x16	775	900^{2}	400(80×5):20:8:5	6.2	15.5	1024	57.6	GDDR5^{2}	128	620	?	11.0	4.3	1.2	—N/a	69	UVD2, PowerPlay, Eyefinity
FirePro 3D V5700	August 8, 2008	TeraScale 1	RV730 XT	55	514	146	PCIe 2.0 x16	700	900	320(64×5):32:8:4	5.6	22.4	512	28.8	GDDR3	128	448	-	10.1	3.3	1.0	—N/a	58	UVD2, PowerPlay
FirePro 3D V5800,	April 26, 2010	TeraScale 2	Juniper XT GL (RV840)	40	1040	166	PCIe 2.1 x16	700	1000^{2}	800(160×5):40:16:10	11.2	28	1024	64	GDDR5^{2}	128	1120	?	11.0	4.3	1.2	—N/a	74	UVD2, PowerPlay, Eyefinity
FirePro 3D V7750	March 27, 2009	TeraScale 1	RV730 XTX	55	514	146	PCIe 2.0 x16	800	900	320(64×5):32:8:4	6.4	25.6	1024	28.8	GDDR3	128	512	-	10.1	3.3	1.0	—N/a	76	UVD2, PowerPlay
FirePro 3D V7800,	April 26, 2010	TeraScale 2	Cypress Pro GL (RV870)	40	2154	334	PCIe 2.1 x16	700	1000^{2}	1440(288×5):72:32:18	22.4	50.4	2048	128	GDDR5^{2}	256	2016	403.2	11.0	4.3	1.2	—N/a	138	UVD2, PowerPlay, Eyefinity
FirePro 3D V8700	September 11, 2008	TeraScale 1	RV770 XT	55	956	256	PCIe 2.1 x16	750	850^{2}	800(160×5):40:16:10	12	30	1024	108.8	GDDR5^{2}	256	1200	240	10.1	3.3	1.0	—N/a	151	UVD2, PowerPlay
FirePro 3D V8750	July 28, 2009	TeraScale 1	RV770 XT	55	956	256	PCIe 2.1 x16	750	900^{2}	800(160×5):40:16:10	12	30	2048	115.2	GDDR5^{2}	256	1200	240	10.1	3.3	1.0	—N/a	154	UVD2, PowerPlay
FirePro 3D V8800	April 7, 2010	TeraScale 2	Cypress XT GL (RV870)	40	2154	334	PCIe 2.1 x16	825	1150^{2}	1600(320×5):80:32:20	26.4	66	2048	147.2	GDDR5^{2}	256	2640	528	11.0	4.3	1.2	—N/a	208	UVD2, PowerPlay, Eyefinity
FirePro 3D V9800	September 9, 2010	TeraScale 2	Cypress XT GL (RV870)	40	2154	334	PCIe 2.1 x16	850	1150^{2}	1600(320×5):80:32:20	27.2	68	4096	147.2	GDDR5^{2}	256	2720	544	11.0	4.3	1.2	—N/a	225	UVD2, PowerPlay, Eyefinity

^{1} Unified shaders : Texture mapping units : Render output units : Compute Units
^{2} The effective data transfer rate of GDDR5 is quadruple its nominal clock, instead of double as it is with other DDR memory
^{3} Windows 7, 8.1, 10 Support for Fire Pro Cards with Terascale 2 and later by firepro driver 15.301.2601

==== FirePro Series (Vx900) ====
Model	Launch	Micro-archi-tecture	Code name	Fab (nm)	Bus interface	Clock rate		Core config^{1}	Fillrate		Memory				Processing power (GFLOPS)		API compliance (version)				TDP (Watts)	Notes
Model	Launch	Micro-archi-tecture	Code name	Fab (nm)	Bus interface	Core (MHz)	Memory (MHz)	Core config^{1}	Pixel (GP/s)	Texture (GT/s)	Size (GiB)	Bandwidth (GB/s)	Bus type	Bus width (bit)	Single precision	Double precision	Direct3D	OpenGL	OpenCL	Vulkan	TDP (Watts)	Notes
FirePro V3900	February 7, 2012	TeraScale 2	Turks GL	40	PCIe 2.1 x16	650	900	480(96×5):24:8:6	5.2	15.6	1	28.8	GDDR3	128	624	-	11.0	4.3	1.2	—N/a	50	HD3D, UVD3, DP 1.2, PowerPlay, Eyefinity
FirePro V4900	November 1, 2011	TeraScale 2	Turks XT GL	40	PCIe 2.1 x16	800	1000	480(96×5):24:8:6	6.4	19.2	1	64	GDDR5^{2}	128	768	-	11.0	4.3	1.2	—N/a	<75 Max	HD3D, UVD3, DP 1.2, PowerPlay, Eyefinity
FirePro V5900	May 24, 2011	TeraScale 3	Cayman LE GL	40	PCIe 2.1 x16	600	500^{2}	512(128×4):32:32:8	19.2	19.2	2	64	GDDR5^{2}	256	610	154	11.0	4.3	1.2	—N/a	<75 Max	HD3D, UVD3, DP 1.2, PowerPlay, Eyefinity
FirePro V7900	May 24, 2011	TeraScale 3	Cayman Pro GL	40	PCIe 2.1 x16	725	1250^{2}	1280(320×4):80:32:20	23.2	58	2	160	GDDR5^{2}	256	1860	464	11.0	4.3	1.2	—N/a	<150 Max	HD3D, UVD3, DP 1.2, PowerPlay, Eyefinity

^{1} Unified shaders : Texture mapping units : Render output units : Compute Units
^{2} The effective data transfer rate of GDDR5 is quadruple its nominal clock, instead of double as it is with other DDR memory.
^{3} Support for Windows 7, 8.1 for OpenGL 4.4 and OpenCL 2.0, when Hardware is prepared with firepro driver 14.502.1045.

==== FirePro Workstation Series (Wx000) ====
- Vulkan 1.0 and OpenGL 4.5 possible for GCN with Driver Update FirePro equal to Radeon Crimson 16.3 or higher.
- Vulkan 1.1 possible for GCN with Radeon Pro Software 18.Q1.1 or higher. It might not fully apply to GCN 1.0 or 1.1 GPUs.

Model	Launch	Micro-archi-tecture	Code name	Fab (nm)	Bus interface	Clock rate		Core config^{1}	Fillrate		Memory				Processing power (GFLOPS)		API compliance (version)				TDP (Watts)	Notes
Model	Launch	Micro-archi-tecture	Code name	Fab (nm)	Bus interface	Core (MHz)	Memory (MHz)	Core config^{1}	Pixel (GP/s)	Texture (GT/s)	Size (GiB)	Bandwidth (GB/s)	Bus type	Bus width (bit)	Single precision	Double precision	Direct3D	OpenGL	OpenCL	Vulkan	TDP (Watts)	Notes
FirePro W600	June 13, 2012	GCN 1st Gen.	Cape Verde Pro GL	28	PCIe 3.0 x16	750	1000	512:32:16:8	12.0	24.0	2	64	GDDR5	128	768	Up to 55	11.1/12	4.5+	1.2+	1.0	75	Six Mini DisplayPort
FirePro W5000	June 13, 2012	GCN 1st Gen.	Pitcairn LE GL	28	PCIe 3.0 x16	825	800	768:48:32:12	26.4	39.6	2	102.4	GDDR5	256	1267.2	79.2	11.1/12	4.5+	1.2+	1.0	<75	Two DisplayPort, one DVI-I; or one DVI-I, one DVI-D
FirePro W7000	June 13, 2012	GCN 1st Gen.	Pitcairn XT GL	28	PCIe 3.0 x16	950	1200	1280:80:32:20	30.4	76.0	4	153.6	GDDR5	256	2432	152	11.1/12	4.5+	1.2+	1.0	<150	ECC RAM, Four DisplayPort
FirePro W8000	June 14, 2012	GCN 1st Gen.	Tahiti PRO GL	28	PCIe 3.0 x16	900	1375	1792:112:32:28	28.8	100.8	4	176	GDDR5	256	3225.6	806.4 (1/4 SP)	11.1/12	4.5+	1.2+	1.0	<225	ECC RAM, Four DisplayPort + SDI-Link
FirePro W9000	June 14, 2012	GCN 1st Gen.	Tahiti XT GL	28	PCIe 3.0 x16	975	1375	2048:128:32:32	31.20	124.8	6	264	GDDR5	384	3993.6	998.4 (1/4 SP)	11.1/12	4.5+	1.2+	1.0	274	ECC RAM, Six mini-DisplayPorts + SDI-Link

^{1} Unified shaders : Texture mapping units : Render output units : Compute Units
^{2} The effective data transfer rate of GDDR5 is quadruple its nominal clock, instead of double as it is with other DDR memory.
^{3} OpenGL 4.4: support with AMD FirePro driver release 14.301.000 or later, in footnotes of specs

==== FirePro D-Series ====
In 2013, AMD released the D-Series specifically for Mac Pro workstations.

Model	Launch	Micro- archi- tecture	Code name	Fab (nm)	Bus interface	Clock rate		Core config^{1}	Fillrate		Memory				Processing power (GFLOPS)		API compliance (version)				TDP (W)	Notes
Model	Launch	Micro- archi- tecture	Code name	Fab (nm)	Bus interface	Core (MHz)	Memory (MHz)	Core config^{1}	Pixel (GP/s)	Texture (GT/s)	Size (GiB)	Bandwidth (GB/s)	Bus type	Bus width	Single precision	Double precision	Direct3D	OpenGL	OpenCL	Vulkan	TDP (W)	Notes
FirePro D300	December 19, 2013	GCN 1st Gen.	Pitcairn XT GL	28	PCIe 3.0 x16	850	1270	1280:80:32:20	24.80	62.00	2	162.6	GDDR5	256 bit	2176	136	11.1	4.6	1.2	1.1.101	150	
FirePro D500	December 19, 2013	GCN 1st Gen.	Tahiti LE GL	28	PCIe 3.0 x16	725	1270	1536:96:32:24	27.20	108.8	3	243.8	GDDR5	384 bit	2227	556.8	11.1	4.6	1.2	1.1.101	274	
FirePro D700	December 19, 2013	GCN 1st Gen.	Tahiti XT GL	28	PCIe 3.0 x16	850	1370	2048:128:32:32	27.20	108.80	6	263	GDDR5	384 bit	3482	870.4	11.1	4.6	1.2	1.1.101	274	

^{1} Unified shaders : Texture mapping units : Render output units : compute units

==== FirePro Workstation Series (Wx100) ====
- Vulkan 1.0 and OpenGL 4.5 possible for GCN with Driver Update FirePro equal to Radeon Crimson 16.3 or higher. OpenCL 2.1 and 2.2 possible for all OpenCL 2.0-Cards with Driver Update in Future (Khronos). Linux Support for OpenCL is limited with AMDGPU Driver 16.60 actual to Version 1.2.
- Vulkan 1.1 possible for GCN with Radeon Pro Software 18.Q1.1 or higher. It might not fully apply to GCN 1.0 or 1.1 GPUs.
- OpenGL 4.6 is available in 18.Q2 (or later) analog to Adrenalin 18.4.1.

Model	Launch	Micro-archi-tecture	Code name	Fab (nm)	Bus interface	Clock rate		Core config^{1}	Fillrate		Memory				Processing power (GFLOPS)		API compliance (version)				TDP (Watts)	Notes
Model	Launch	Micro-archi-tecture	Code name	Fab (nm)	Bus interface	Core (MHz)	Memory (MHz)	Core config^{1}	Pixel (GP/s)	Texture (GT/s)	Size (GiB)	Bandwidth (GB/s)	Bus type	Bus width (bit)	Single precision	Double precision	Direct3D	OpenGL	OpenCL	Vulkan	TDP (Watts)	Notes
FirePro W2100	August 13, 2014	GCN 1st gen	Oland XT	28	PCIe 3.0 x8	630	900	320:20:8:5	5.04	12.6	2	28.8	DDR3	128	403.2	25.5 (1/16 SP)	11.2a/12.0	4.5+	2.0 (new)	1.0	<26	Two Standard DisplayPort DP 1.2a outputs
FirePro W4100	August 13, 2014	GCN 1st gen	Cape Verde	28	PCIe 3.0 x16	630	1125	512:32:16:8	10.08	20.16	2	72	GDDR5	128	645.1	40.3 (1/16 SP)	11.2a/12.0	4.5+	2.0 (new)	1.0	<50	Four Standard Mini-DP 1.2a outputs
FirePro W5100	August 13, 2014	GCN 2nd gen	Bonaire Pro	28	PCIe 3.0 x16	930	1500	768:48:16:12	14.88	44.64	4	96	GDDR5	128	1430	89.2 (1/16 SP)	11.2b/12.0	4.5+	2.0	1.0	<75	DirectGMA, GeometryBoost, 4 DP 1.2a, including Adaptive-Sync and HBR2
FirePro W7100	August 13, 2014	GCN 3rd gen	Tonga Pro GL	28	PCIe 3.0 x16	920	1400	1792:112:32:28	29.4	103	8	160	GDDR5	256	3297	206 (1/16 SP)	11.2b/12.0	4.5+	2.0	1.1	<150	DirectGMA, GeometryBoost, 4 DP 1.2a, including Adaptive-Sync and HBR2
FirePro W8100	June 26, 2014	GCN 2nd gen	Hawaii Pro GL	28	PCIe 3.0 x16	824	1250	2560:160:64:40	52.7	145	8	320	GDDR5	512	4218.9	2109.45 (1/2 SP)	11.2b/12.0	4.5+	2.0	1.0	220	ECC RAM, 4 DP + SDI-Link
FirePro W9100	March 26, 2014	GCN 2nd gen	Hawaii XT	28	PCIe 3.0 x16	930	1250	2816:176:64:44	59.5	163.7	16; 32	320	GDDR5	512	5237.8	2618.9 (1/2 SP)	11.2b/12.0	4.5+	2.0	1.0	275	ECC RAM, Six Mini DP + SDI-Link

^{1} Unified shaders : Texture mapping units : Render output units : compute units
^{2} The effective data transfer rate of GDDR5 is quadruple its nominal clock, instead of double as it is with other DDR memory.
^{3} OpenGL 4.4: support with AMD FirePro driver release 14.301.000 or later, in footnotes of specs

==== FirePro Workstation Series (Wx300) ====
- Vulkan 1.1 possible for GCN with Radeon Pro Software 18.Q1.1 or higher. It might not fully apply to GCN 1.0 or 1.1 GPUs.

Model	Launch	Code name	Fab (nm)	Bus interface	Clock rate		Core config^{1}	Fillrate		Memory				Processing power (GFLOPS)		API compliance (version)				TDP (Watts)	Notes
Model	Launch	Code name	Fab (nm)	Bus interface	Core (MHz)	Memory (MHz)	Core config^{1}	Pixel (GP/s)	Texture (GT/s)	Size (GiB)	Bandwidth (GB/s)	Bus type	Bus width (bit)	Single precision	Double precision	Direct3D	OpenGL	OpenCL	Vulkan	TDP (Watts)	Notes
FirePro W4300	December 1, 2015	Bonaire PRO (GCN 2nd Gen)	28	PCIe 3.0 x16	930	1500	768:48:16:12	14.88	44.64	4	96	GDDR5	128	1428.5	89.3 (1/16 SP)	11.2/12.0 SM 5.0	4.5+	2.0 (2.1 beta, 2.2 possible)	1.0	<50	4 Mini DisplayPort 1.2a outputs, low profile

=== Mobile Workstation ===
==== Mobility FireGL Series ====
Model (Codename)	Launch	Architecture (Fab)	Core		Fillrate (Note: Texture fillrate is calculated as the number of Texture Mapping Units multiplied by the base (or boost) core clock speed.) (Note: Pixel fillrate is calculated as the number of Render Output Units multiplied by the base (or boost) core clock speed.)		Processing power (Note: Single precision performance is calculated from the base (or boost) core clock speed based on a FMA operation.) (GFLOPS)	Memory				Bus interface	Notes
Model (Codename)	Launch	Architecture (Fab)	Config	Clock (MHz)	Texture (GT/s)	Pixel (GP/s)	Processing power (GFLOPS)	Size (MB)	Bus type & width (bit)	Clock (MHz)	Band- width (GB/s)	Bus interface	Notes
Mobility FireGL 7800 (M7-GL)	2001-09-29	R100 (150 nm)	0:2:2:2 (Note: Vertex shader : Pixel shaders: Texture Mapping Units : Render Output Units)	280	0.56	0.56	Unknown	64	DDR; 128-bit	200	6.4	AGP 4x	27 Watt TDP
Mobility FireGL 9000 (M9-GL)	2002-01-01	R200 (150 nm)	1:4:4:4	250	1.0	1.0	Unknown	64	DDR; 128-bit	200	6.4	AGP 4x	
Mobility FireGL T2 (M10-GL)	2003-11-01	R300 (130 nm)	2:4:4:4	320	1.28	1.28	Unknown	128	DDR; 128-bit	200	6.5	AGP 4x	
Mobility FireGL T2e (M11-GL)	2004-08-01	R300 (130 nm)	2:4:4:4	450	1.8	1.8	Unknown	128	DDR; 128-bit	225	7.2	AGP 4x	
Mobility FireGL V3100 (M22-GL)	2004-06-01	R300 (110 nm)	2:4:4:4	350	1.4	1.4	Unknown	128	DDR; 128-bit	200	6.4	PCIe 1.0 x16	
Mobility FireGL V3200 (M24-GL)	2004-06-01	R300 (130 nm)	2:4:4:4	400	1.6	1.6	Unknown	128	DDR2; 128-bit	250	12.8	PCIe 1.0 x16	
Mobility FireGL V5000 (M26-GL)	2005-02-03	R420 (110 nm)	6:8:8:8	350	2.8	2.8	Unknown	128	GDDR3; 128-bit	425	13.6	PCIe 1.0 x16	
Mobility FireGL V5200 (M56-GL)	2006-02-01	R520 (90 nm)	5:12:12:12	425	5.1	5.1	Unknown	256	GDDR3; 128-bit	475	15.2	PCIe 1.0 x16	
Mobility FireGL V5250 (M66-GL)	2007-01-01	R520 (90 nm)	5:12:12:12	450	5.4	5.4	Unknown	256	GDDR3; 128-bit	350	11.2	PCIe 1.0 x16	
Mobility FireGL V5600 (M76-GL)	2007-05-14	TeraScale 1 (65 nm)	120:8:4 (Note: Unified Shaders : Texture Mapping Units : Render Output Units)	500	4.0	2.0	120.0	256	GDDR3; 128-bit	400	12.8	PCIe 2.0 x16	
Mobility FireGL V5700 (M86-GL)	2008-01-07	Terascale 2 (55 nm)	120:8:4	600	4.8	2.4	144	512	GDDR3; 128-bit	700	22.4	PCIe 2.0 x16	in Lenovo ThinkPad W500
Mobility FireGL V5725 (M86-GL)	2009-01-01	Terascale 2 (55 nm)	120:8:4	680	5.44	2.72	163.2	256	GDDR3; 128-bit	800	25.6	PCIe 2.0 x16	

==== FirePro Mobile Series ====
Model (Codename)	Launch	Architecture (Fab)	Core		Fillrate (Note: Texture fillrate is calculated as the number of Texture Mapping Units multiplied by the base (or boost) core clock speed.) (Note: Pixel fillrate is calculated as the number of Render Output Units multiplied by the base (or boost) core clock speed.)		Processing power (Note: Single precision performance is calculated from the base (or boost) core clock speed based on a FMA operation.) (GFLOPS)	Memory				Bus interface	Notes
Model (Codename)	Launch	Architecture (Fab)	Config (Note: Unified Shaders : Texture Mapping Units : Render Output Units) (CU)	Clock (MHz)	Texture (GT/s)	Pixel (GP/s)	Processing power (GFLOPS)	Size (MB)	Bus type & width (bit)	Clock (MHz)	Band- width (GB/s)	Bus interface	Notes
FirePro M5725 (M96 GL)	2009-01-01	Terascale 2 (55 nm)	320:32:8 (3)	680	21.6	5.4	432	256	GDDR3; 128-bit	800	25.6	PCIe 2.0 x16	
FirePro M5800 (Madison XT GL)	2010-03-01	Terascale 2 (40 nm)	400:20:8 (5)	650	13	5.2	520	1024	GDDR5; 128-bit	800	25.6	PCIe 2.0 x16	HP EliteBook 8540w
FirePro M3900 (Seymour XT)	2011-04-13	Terascale 2 (40 nm)	160:8:4 (2)	700	6.0	3.0	224	1024	DDR3; 64-bit	900	14.4	PCIe 2.1 x16	HP Elitebook 8460w
FirePro M5950 (Whistler XT)	2011-01-04	Terascale 2 (40 nm)	480:24:8 (6)	725	17.4	5.8	696	1024	GDDR5; 128-bit	900	57.6	PCIe 2.1 x16	Dell Precision M4600, HP EliteBook 8560w
FirePro M7740 (M97XT GL)	2009-08-04	Terascale 1 (40 nm)	640:32:16 (8)	650	20.8	10.4	832	1024	GDDR5; 128-bit	1000	64	PCIe 2.0 x16	Dell Precision M6400 and M6500
FirePro M7820 (Juniper XT)	2010-05-01	Terascale 2 (40 nm)	800:40:16 (10)	700	28	11.2	1120	1024	GDDR5; 128-bit	1000	64	PCIe 2.0 x16	Dell Precision M6500, HP EliteBook 8740w
FirePro M8900 (Blackcomb XT GL)	2011-04-12	Terascale 2 (40 nm)	960:48:32 (12)	680	32.64	21.76	1310	2048	GDDR5; 256-bit	900	115.2	PCIe 2.1 x16	Dell Precision M6600
FirePro M2000 (Turks GL)	2012-07-01	Terascale 2 (40 nm)	480:24:8 (6)	500	12	4	480	1024	GDDR5; 64-bit	800	25.6	PCIe 2.1 x16	HP EliteBook 8470w
FirePro M4000 (Chelsea XT GL)	2012-06-27	GCN 1^{st} gen (28 nm)	512:32:16 (8)	600	19.2	9.6	614	2048	GDDR5; 128-bit	1000	51.2	PCIe 2.1 x16	HP EliteBook 8570w, HP EliteBook 8770w, Dell Precision M4700 (e.g. Consumer HD7700M Serie DevID 682D)
FirePro M6000 (Heathrow XT GL)	2012-06-27	GCN 1^{st} gen (28 nm)	640:40:16 (10)	800	30	12	960	2048	GDDR5; 128-bit	1000	64	PCIe 3.0 x16	Dell Precision M6700
FirePro M4100 (Mars)	2013-10-16	GCN 1^{st} gen (28 nm)	384:24:8 (6)	670	16.1	5.4	514	2048	GDDR5; 128-bit	1000	64	PCIe 3.0 x16	HP ZBook 14
FirePro W4170M (Mars XTX)	2014-04-28	GCN 1^{st} gen (28 nm)	384:24:8 (6)	825	19.8	6.6	691.2	2048	GDDR5; 128-bit	1125	72	PCIe 3.0 x16	Dell Precision M2800, HP ZBook 15u G2
FirePro W4190M (Opal)	2015-11-12	GCN 1^{st} gen (28 nm)	384:24:8 (6)	825	19.8	6.6	634	2048	GDDR5; 128-bit	900	72	PCIe 3.0 x16	HP ZBook 15u G3, MXM-3-A, OpenGL 4.6, OpenCL 2.0, TDP 25W
FirePro M5100 (Venus XT)	2013-10-16	GCN 1^{st} gen (28 nm)	640:40:16 (10)	775	31	12.4	992	2048	GDDR5; 128-bit	1125	72	PCIe 3.0 x16	Dell Precision M4800, Panasonic Toughbook 54, HP ZBook 15 G2 (e.g. R9 M200X Serie DevID 6821)
FirePro W5130M (Tropo LE)	2015-10-02	GCN 1^{st} gen (28 nm)	512:32:16 (8)	up to 925	28.8	14.4	up to 950	up to 2048	GDDR5; 128-bit	1000	64	PCIe 3.0 x16	Dell Precision 3510 (e.g. Consumer R7 M465X DevID 682B) MXM-3-A, DirectX 12.0 (feature level 11_1), OpenGL 4.6, OpenCL 2.0, Vulkan 1.0, TDP 35W
FirePro W5170M (Tropo XT)	2014-08-25	GCN 1^{st} gen (28 nm)	640:40:16 (10)	up to 925	36.0	14.4	up to 1180	up to 2048	GDDR5; 128-bit	1125	72	PCIe 3.0 x16	Dell Precision 7510, Dell Precision 7710, HP ZBook 15 G3 (e.g. Consumer R9 M375X DevID 6820 REV 083) MXM-3-A, DirectX 12.0 (feature level 11_1), OpenGL 4.6, OpenCL 2.0, Vulkan 1.0, TDP 45W
FirePro M6100 (Saturn XT GL)	2013-10-16	GCN 2^{nd} gen (28 nm)	768: 48:16 (12)	up to 1100	51.6	17.2	1651.2	2048	GDDR5; 128-bit	1375/1500	88/96	PCIe 3.0 x16	Dell Precision M6600 / M6800, HP Zbook 17 G2
FirePro W6150M (Saturn XT GL)	2015-11-12	GCN 2^{nd} gen (28 nm)	768:48:16 (12)	1075	51.6	17.2	1651	4096	GDDR5; 128-bit	1375	88	PCIe 3.0 x16	HP Zbook 17 G3, MXM-3-B, OpenGL 4.6, OpenCL 2.0, TDP 100W
FirePro W6170M (Saturn XT GL)	2014-08-25	GCN 2^{nd} gen (28 nm)	768:48:16 (12)	1075	51.6	17.2	1651	4096	GDDR5; 128-bit	1375	88	PCIe 3.0 x16	HP ZBook 17 G2
FirePro W7170M (Amethyst XT)	2015-10-02	GCN 3^{rd} gen (28 nm)	2048:128:32 (32)	723	92.5	23.1	2960	4096	GDDR5; 256-bit	1250	160	PCIe 3.0 x16	Dell Precision 7710, MXM-3-B, DirectX 12.0 (feature level 11_1), OpenGL 4.6, OpenCL 2.0, Vulkan 1.0, TDP 100W

=== Server ===
==== FireStream Series ====
Model (Codename)	Launch	Architecture (Fab)	Bus interface	Stream processors	Clock rate		Memory				Processing power (Note: Precision performance is calculated from the base (or boost) core clock speed based on a FMA operation.) (GFLOPS)		TDP (Watts)
Model (Codename)	Launch	Architecture (Fab)	Bus interface	Stream processors	Core (MHz)	Memory (MHz)	Size (MB)	Type	Bus width (bit)	Bandwidth (GB/s)	Single	Double	TDP (Watts)
Stream Processor (R580)	2006	R500; 80 nm		240	600		1024	GDDR3	256	83.2	375	N/A	165
FireStream 9170 (RV670)	November 8, 2007	TeraScale 1; 55 nm	PCIe 2.0 x16	320	800	800	2048	GDDR3	256	51.2	512	102.4	105
FireStream 9250 (RV770)	June 16, 2008	TeraScale 1; 55 nm	PCIe 2.0 x16	800	625	993	1024	GDDR3	256	63.6	1000	200	150
FireStream 9270 (RV770)	November 13, 2008	TeraScale 1; 55 nm	PCIe 2.0 x16	800	750	850	2048	GDDR5	256	108.8	1200	240	160
FireStream 9350 (Cypress XT)	June 23, 2010	TeraScale 2; 40 nm	PCIe 2.1 x16	1440	700	1000	2048	GDDR5	256	128	2016	403.2	150
FireStream 9370 (Cypress XT)	June 23, 2010	TeraScale 2; 40 nm	PCIe 2.1 x16	1600	825	1150	4096	GDDR5	256	147.2	2640	528	225

==== FirePro Remote Series ====
Model	Launch	Code name	Fab (nm)	Bus interface	Clock rate		Core config^{1}	Fillrate		Memory				Processing power (GFLOPS)		API compliance (version)			TDP (Watts)	Notes
Model	Launch	Code name	Fab (nm)	Bus interface	Core (MHz)	Memory (MHz)	Core config^{1}	Pixel (GP/s)	Texture (GT/s)	Size (MB)	Bandwidth (GB/s)	Bus type	Bus width (bit)	Single precision	Double precision	Direct3D	OpenGL	OpenCL	TDP (Watts)	Notes
FirePro RG220	May 2010	RV711	55	PCIe 2.0 x16	500	800	80(16×5):8:4:1	2.0	4.0	512	12.8	GDDR3 for GPU, RDRAM for PCoIP	64	80	No	10.1	3.3	1.0	35	Dual Ethernet ports plus DMS-59 for dual DVI-D output (no VGA host output)
FirePro R5000	February 25, 2013	Pitcairn LE GL (GCN 1st gen)	28	PCIe 3.0 x16	825	800	768:48:32:12	26.4	39.6	2048	102.4	GDDR5	256	1267.2	79.2 (1/16 SP)	11.1	4.5+	1.2+	<150	Ethernet port plus Two Mini DisplayPort w/ Tera2 PCoIP

^{1} Unified shaders : Texture mapping units : Render output units : compute units
^{2} The effective data transfer rate of GDDR5 is quadruple its nominal clock, instead of double as it is with other DDR memory.

==== FirePro Server Series (S000x/Sxx 000) ====
- Vulkan 1.0 and OpenGL 4.5 possible for GCN with Driver Update FirePro equal to Radeon Crimson 16.3 or higher. OpenGL 4.5 was only in Windows available. Actual Linux Driver support OpenGL 4.5 and Vulkan 1.0, but only OpenCL 1.2 by AMDGPU Driver 16.60.
- Vulkan 1.1 possible for GCN with Radeon Pro Software 18.Q1.1 or higher. It might not fully apply to GCN 1.0 or 1.1 GPUs.
- OpenGL 4.6 is available in 18.Q2 (or later) analog to Adrenalin 18.4.1.

Model	Launch	Micro-archi-tecture	Code name	Fab (nm)	Bus inter- face	Clock rate		Core config^{1}	Fillrate		Memory				Processing power (GFLOPS)		API compliance (version)				TDP (Watts)	Notes
Model	Launch	Micro-archi-tecture	Code name	Fab (nm)	Bus inter- face	Core (MHz)	Memory (MHz)	Core config^{1}	Pixel (GP/s)	Texture (GT/s)	Size (GiB)	Bandwidth (GB/s)	Bus type	Bus width (bit)	Single precision	Double precision	Direct X	OpenGL	OpenCL	Vulkan	TDP (Watts)	Notes
FirePro S4000x	August 7, 2014	GCN 1st Gen	Venus XT	28	PCIe 3.0 x16	950	1200	640:40:16:10	11.6	29	2	72	GDDR5	256	992	62 (1/16 SP)	11.1 12.0	4.5+	1.2+	1.0	<45	Type A MXM form factor, No physical display outputs,
FirePro S7000	August 27, 2012	GCN 1st gen	Pitcairn XT	28	PCIe 3.0 x16	950	1200	1280:80:32:20	30.4	76	4	153.6	GDDR5	256	2432	152 (1/16 SP)	11.1 12.0	4.5+	1.2+	1.0	<150	One DP
FirePro S7100X	May 25, 2016	GCN 3rd gen	Amethyst XT	28	PCIe 3.0 x16	723	1050	2048:128:32:32	23.14	92.5	8	160	GDDR5	256	2961	185.1 (1/16 SP)	11.2 12.0	4.5+	2.0+	1.1	100	For Blade Servers, MXM Module 3.1
FirePro S7150	February 1, 2016	GCN 3rd gen	Tonga PRO GL	28	PCIe 3.0 x16	1050	1250	1792:112:32:28	33.6	117.6	8	160	GDDR5	256	3763	235.2 (1/16 SP)	11.2 12.0	4.5+	2.0+	1.1	150	ECC RAM, two Slots
FirePro S7150 X2	February 1, 2016	GCN 3rd gen	2x Tonga PRO GL	28	PCIe 3.0 x16	1050	1250	2x 1792:112:32:28	33.6	117.6	16	2x 160	GDDR5	256	7540	470.4 (1/16 SP)	11.2 12.0	4.5+	2.0+	1.1	265	ECC RAM, no physical display outputs
FirePro S9000	August 27, 2012	GCN 1st gen	Tahiti PRO GL	28	PCIe 3.0 x16	900	1375	1792:112:32:28	28.8	100.8	6	264	GDDR5	384	3225.6	806.4 (1/4 SP)	11.1 12.0	4.5+	1.2+	1.0	<225	ECC RAM, One DP
FirePro S9050	August 6, 2014	GCN 1st gen	Tahiti PRO GL	28	PCIe 3.0 x16	900	1375	1792:112:32:28	28.8	100.8	12	264	GDDR5	384	3225.6	806.4 (1/4 SP)	11.1 12.0	4.5+	1.2+	1.0	<225	ECC RAM, One DP
FirePro S9100	October 2, 2014	GCN 2nd gen	Hawaii GL	28	PCIe 3.0 x16	824	1250	2560:160:64:40	52.74	131.8	12	320	GDDR5	512	4219	2109	11.1 12.0	4.6	2.0	1.0	<225	ECC RAM, No physical display outputs
FirePro S9150	August 6, 2014	GCN 2nd gen	Hawaii XT GL	28	PCIe 3.0 x16	900	1250	2816:176:64:44	57.6	158.4	16	320	GDDR5	512	5070	2530 (1/2 SP)	11.2 12.0	4.5+	2.0+	1.0	<235	ECC RAM, No physical display outputs
FirePro S9170	July 8, 2015	GCN 2nd gen	Grenada XT GL	28	PCIe 3.0 x16	930	1375	2816:176:64:44	59.52	163.68	32	320	GDDR5	512	5240	2620 (1/2 SP)	11.2 12.0	4.5+	2.0+	1.0	<275	ECC RAM, Full Throughput double precision, no physical display outputs
FirePro S9300 x2	March 31, 2016	GCN 3rd gen	2× Capsaicin XT	28	PCIe 3.0 x16	850	2x 500	2× 4096:256:64:64	54.4	217.6	2× 4	2× 512	HBM	4096	13900	868 (1/16 SP)	11.2 12.0	4.5+	2.0+	1.1	300	Non-ECC RAM, half-precision (FP16) support, no physical display outputs
FirePro S10000	November 12, 2012	GCN 1st gen	2× Zaphod (Tahiti Pro GL)	28	PCIe 3.0 x16	825	1250	2× 1792:112:32:28	52.8	184.8	2× 3	2× 240	GDDR5	384	5913.6	1478.4 (1/4 SP)	11.1 12.0	4.5+	1.2+	1.0	<375	ECC RAM, 4x DP, 1× DVI-I
FirePro S10000 passive	November 12, 2012	GCN 1st gen	2× Tahiti PRO GL	28	PCIe 3.0 x16	825	1250	2× 1792:112:32:28	52.8	184.8	2× 3	2× 240	GDDR5	384	5913.6	1478.4 (1/4 SP)	11.1 12.0	4.5+	1.2+	1.0	<375	ECC RAM, 1× Mini DP, 1× DVI-I

^{1} Unified shaders : Texture mapping units : Render output units: Compute units
^{2} The effective data transfer rate of GDDR5 is quadruple its nominal clock, instead of double as it is with other DDR memory.
^{3} OpenGL 4.4: support with AMD FirePro driver release 14.301.000 or later, in footnotes of specs

==== Radeon Sky Series ====
Model	Launch	Code name	Fab (nm)	Bus interface	Clock rate		Core config^{1}	Fillrate		Memory				Processing power (GFLOPS)		API compliance (version)				TDP (Watts)	Notes
Model	Launch	Code name	Fab (nm)	Bus interface	Core (MHz)	Memory (MHz)	Core config^{1}	Pixel (GP/s)	Texture (GT/s)	Size (GiB)	Bandwidth (GB/s)	Bus type	Bus width (bit)	Single precision	Double precision	Direct3D	OpenGL	OpenCL	Vulkan	TDP (Watts)	Notes
Radeon Sky 500	April 2013	Pitcairn XT	28	PCIe 3.0 x16	950	1200	1280:80:32:20	30.4	76	4	153.6	GDDR5	256	2432	152	12.0	4.5+	1.2+	1.0 possible with driver	150	One DisplayPort
Radeon Sky 700	April 2013	Tahiti PRO	28	PCIe 3.0 x16	900	1375	1792:112:32:28	28.8	100.8	6	264	GDDR5	384	3225.6	806.4	12.0	4.5+	1.2+	1.0 possible with driver	225	One DisplayPort
Radeon Sky 900	April 2013	2× Tahiti PRO	28	PCIe 3.0 x16	825 950	1250	2× 1792:112:32:28	52.8	184.8	2× 3	2× 240	GDDR5	2x 384	5913.6	1478.4	12.0	4.5+	1.2+	1.0 possible with driver	300	Four Mini DisplayPort, One DVI-I

^{1} Unified shaders : Texture mapping units : Render output units : compute units
^{2} The effective data transfer rate of GDDR5 is quadruple its nominal clock, instead of double as it is with other DDR memory.

== See also ==
- Nvidia Quadro – Nvidia's competing workstation graphics solution
- Nvidia Tesla – Nvidia's competing GPGPU solution
- Xeon Phi - Intel's competing High-performance computing solution
- List of AMD graphics processing units
