= GDDR SDRAM =

Type of memory used on graphics cards

Graphics DDR SDRAM (GDDR SDRAM) is a type of synchronous dynamic random-access memory (SDRAM) specifically designed for applications requiring high bandwidth, e.g. graphics processing units (GPUs). GDDR SDRAM is distinct from the more widely known types of DDR SDRAM, such as DDR4 and DDR5, although they share some of the same features—including double data rate (DDR) data transfers. As of 2025, GDDR SDRAM has been succeeded by GDDR2, GDDR3, GDDR4, GDDR5, GDDR5X, GDDR6, GDDR6X, GDDR6W and GDDR7.

== Generations ==
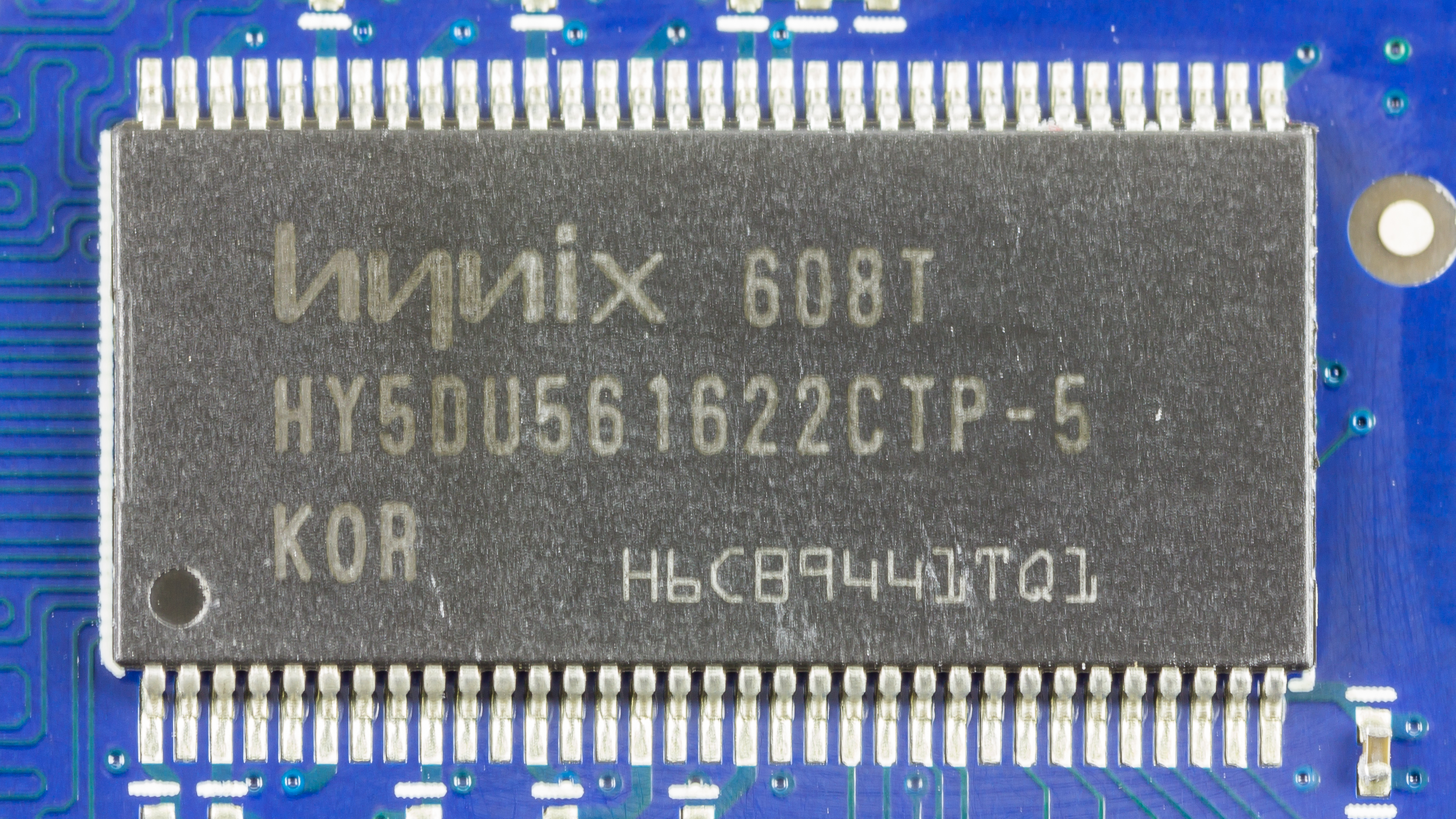
Hynix GDDR SDRAM

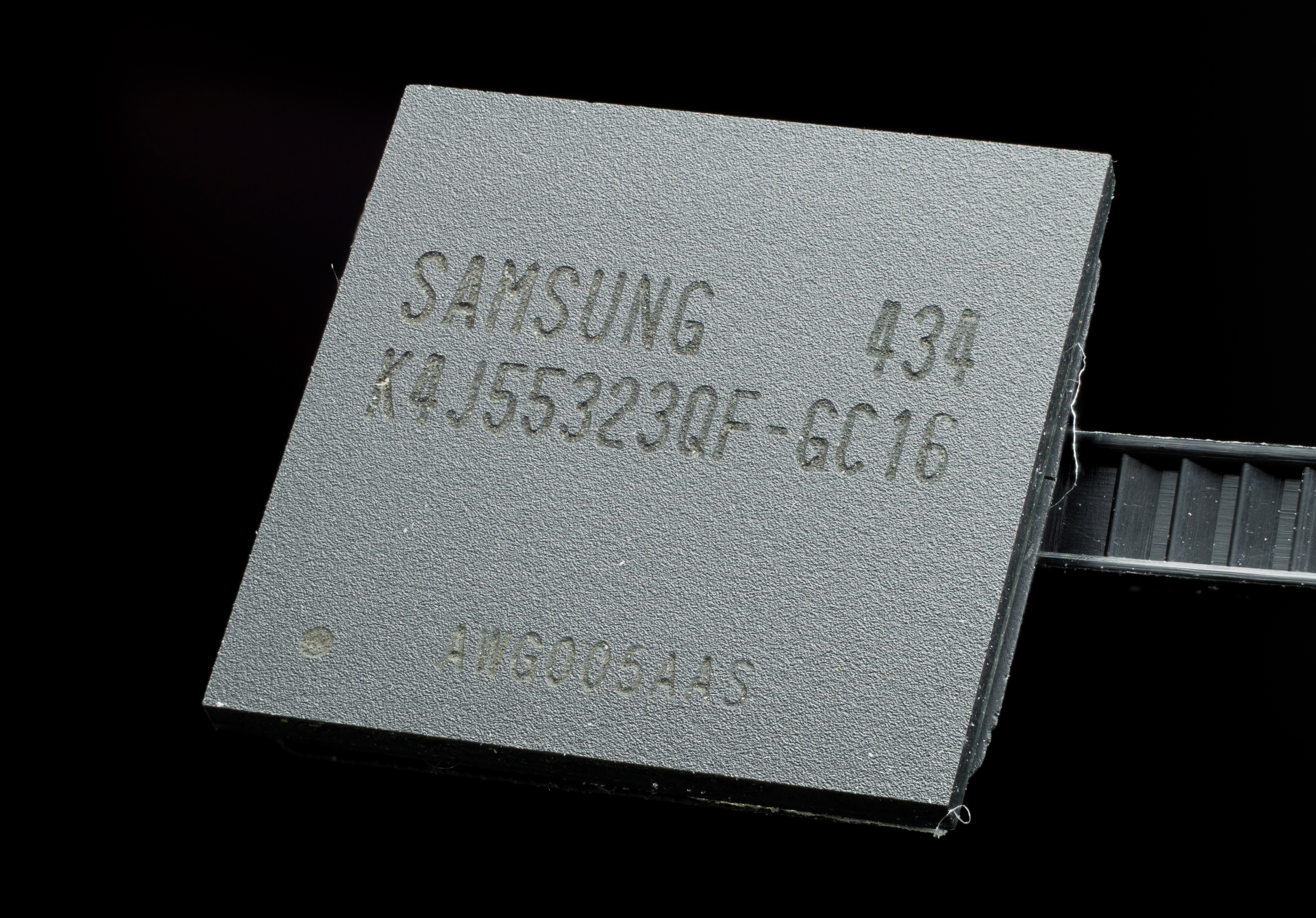
A Samsung GDDR3 256 Mbit package

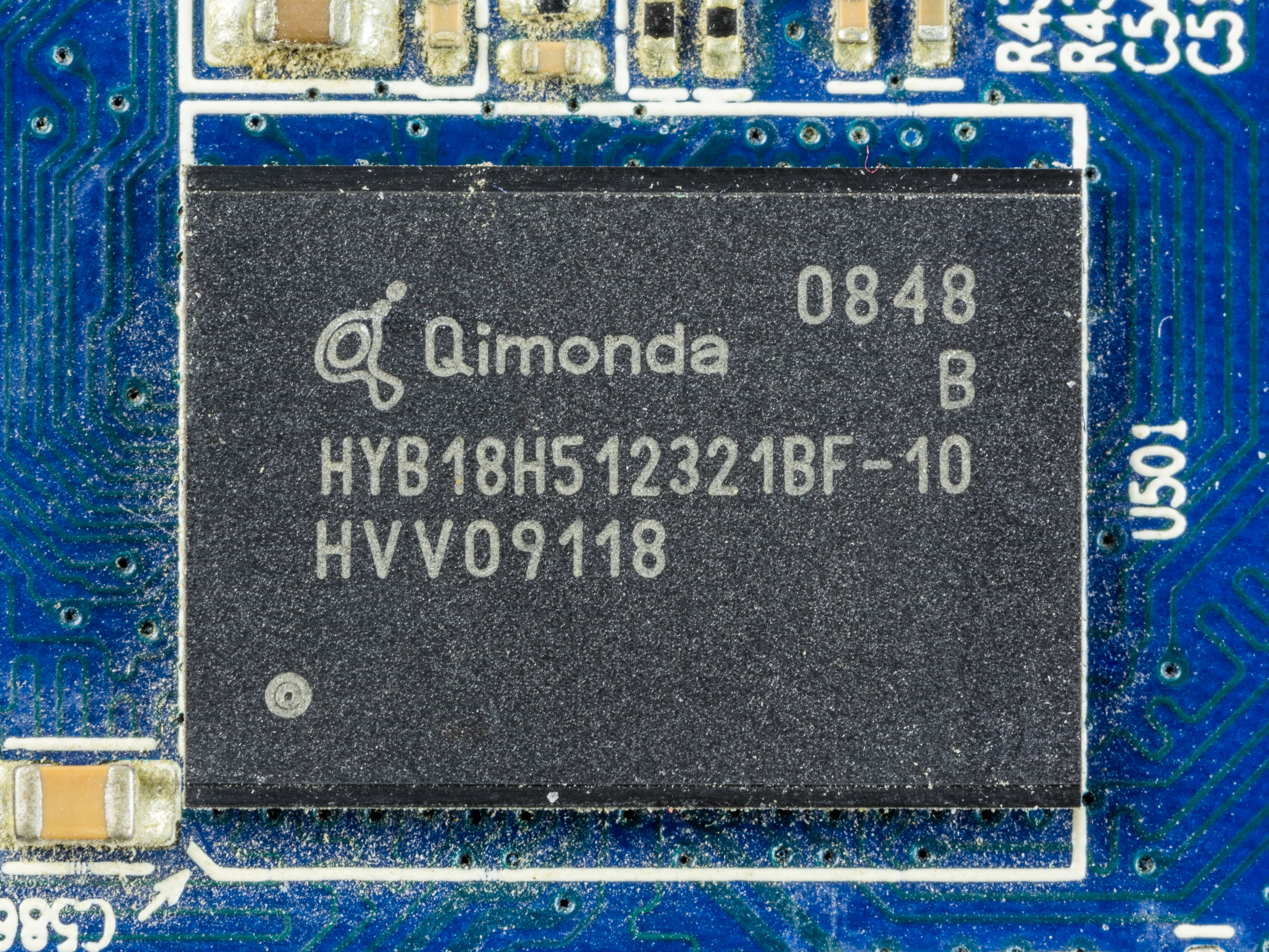
A 512 Mbit Qimonda GDDR3 SDRAM package

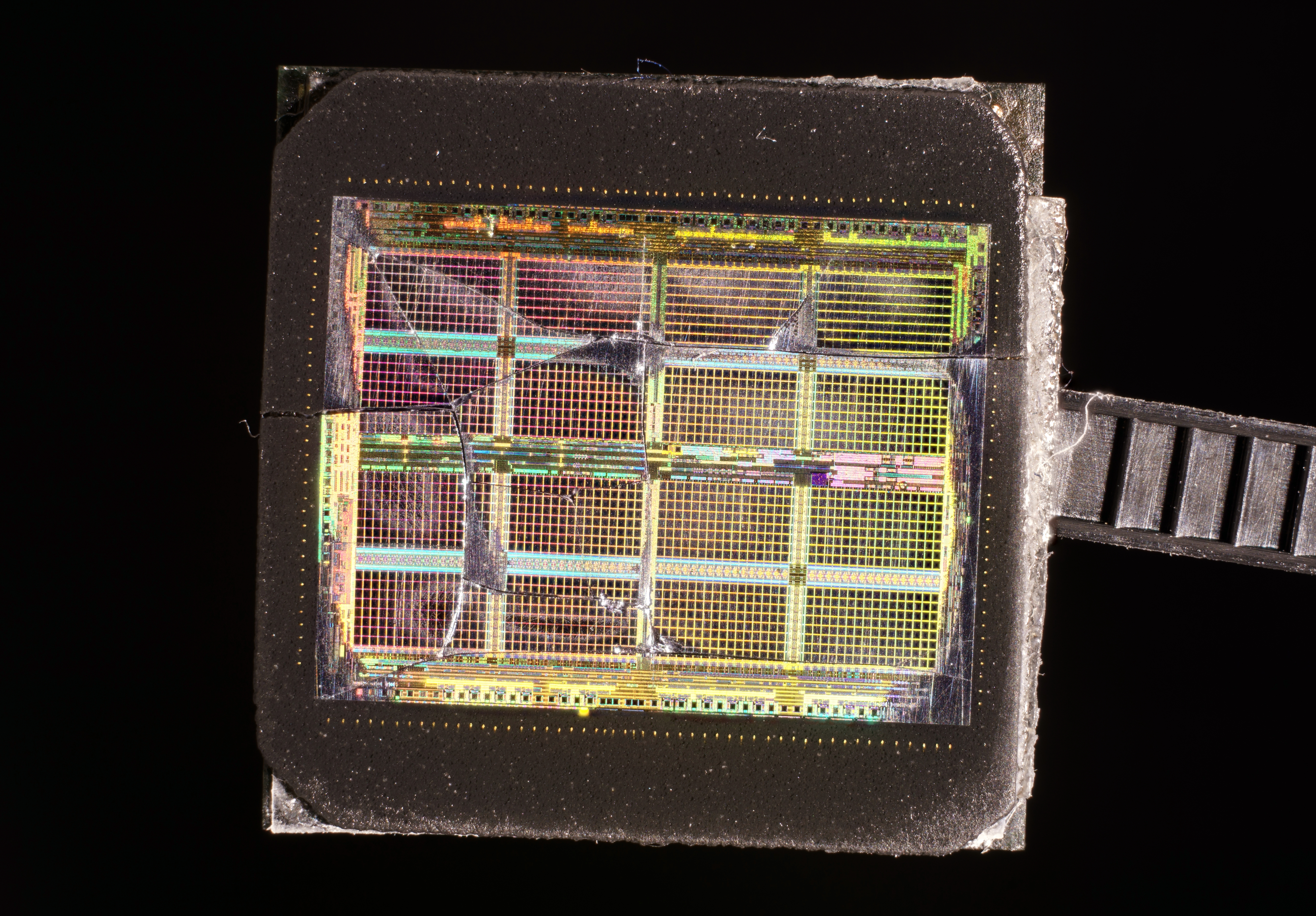
Inside a Samsung GDDR3 256 Mbit package

=== DDR SGRAM ===
GDDR was initially known as DDR SGRAM (double-data-rate synchronous graphics RAM). It was commercially introduced as a 16 Mbit memory chip by Samsung Electronics in 1998. Compared to DDR SDRAM, which is byte-accessible, GDDR SDRAM is block-accessible.

== Table of transfer rates ==
Module type	Chip type	Memory clock	Transfers/s	Transfers/clock	Transfer rate	
32 lanes	GDDR2	400–500 MHz	0.8–1.0 GT/s	2	25.6–32.0 Gbit/s	3.2–4.0 GB/s
32 lanes	GDDR3	400–1000 MHz	0.8–2.0 GT/s	2	25.6–64.0 Gbit/s	3.2–8.0 GB/s
32 lanes	GDDR4	868–1126 MHz	1.7–2.3 GT/s	2	55.6–72.1 Gbit/s	6.9–9.0 GB/s
32 lanes	GDDR5	1000–2000 MHz	4.0–8.0 GT/s	4	128.0–256.0 Gbit/s	16.0–32.0 GB/s
32 lanes	GDDR5X	1000–1808 MHz	8.0–14.5 GT/s	8	256.0–462.8 Gbit/s	32.0–57.9 GB/s
32 lanes	GDDR6	1375–2500 MHz	11.0–20.0 GT/s	8	352.0–640.0 Gbit/s	44.0–80.0 GB/s
32 lanes	GDDR6X	1188–1438 MHz	19.0–23.0 GT/s	16	608.0–736.0 Gbit/s	76.0–92.0 GB/s
64 lanes	GDDR6W	1375 MHz	22.0 GT/s	16	1408.0 Gbit/s	176.0 GB/s
32 lanes	GDDR7	1750–2500 MHz	28.0–40.0 GT/s	16	896.0–1280.0 Gbit/s	112.0–160.0 GB/s

(1 lane is equivalent to 1 bit/transfer.)

== See also ==
- Video random-access memory
- High Bandwidth Memory
