= Comparison of PlayStation consoles =

== 2013–present ==
Model		PlayStation 4	PlayStation 4 Slim	PlayStation 4 Pro	PlayStation Classic	PlayStation 5	PlayStation 5 Digital Edition
Image							
Key dates	First released	November 2013	September 2016	November 2016	December 2018	November 2020	
Key dates	Discontinued	September 2016	In production	January 2021	In production		
Dimensions (WxHxD)		275 mm × 53 mm × 305 mm (10.8 in × 2.1 in × 12.0 in)	265 mm × 39 mm × 288 mm (10.4 in × 1.5 in × 11.3 in)	295 mm × 55 mm × 327 mm (11.6 in × 2.2 in × 12.9 in)	149 mm × 33 mm × 105 mm (5.9 in × 1.3 in × 4.1 in)	390 mm × 104 mm × 260 mm (15.4 in × 4.1 in × 10.2 in)	390 mm × 92 mm × 260 mm (15.4 in × 3.6 in × 10.2 in)
Weight		2.5–2.8 kg (5.5–6.2 lb)	2.1 kg (4.6 lb)	3.3 kg (7.3 lb)	170 g (6.0 oz)	3.9–4.5 kg (8.6–9.9 lb)	3.4–3.9 kg (7.5–8.6 lb)
Storage	Capacity	500 GB or 1 TB	1 TB	1 TB or 2 TB	16 GB	825 GB	
Storage	Type	HDD			eMMC Flash	SSD	
Storage	Bandwidth	50-100 MB/s			132 MB/s	5.5 GB/s	
Optical drive		Yes			No	Yes	No
CPU	Cores	8			4	8	
CPU	Threads	8			4	16	
CPU	Clock speed	1.6 GHz		2.1 GHz	1.5 GHz	3.5 GHz	
GPU	Cores	18		36	2	36	
GPU	Threads	?			?	?	
GPU	Clock speed	800 MHz		911 MHz	660 MHz	2.23 GHz	
GPU	Ray tracing	No				Yes	
Memory		8 GB GDDR5			1 GB DDR3	16 GB GDDR6	
Ports		1x AUX 2x Front USB 3.0 1x HDMI 2.0a	1x AUX 2x USB 3.1 1x HDMI 2.0a	1x AUX 3x USB 3.1 1x HDMI 2.0b	1x HDMI	1x Front USB 2.0 1x Front USB-C 2x Back USB 3.1 1x HDMI 2.1	
Power supply		165 W		310 W	5 W	350 W	340 W
Network	Ethernet	Gigabit Ethernet			No	Gigabit Ethernet	
Network	Wi-Fi	4 (802.11n)	5 (802.11ac)		No	6 (802.11ax)	
Network	Bluetooth	2.1	4.0		No	5.1	
Storage expansion	Upgradable	Yes (up to 8 TB)			With Modifications	No	
Storage expansion	Expandable	No			With Modifications	M.2 NVMe PCIe 4.0 (up to 8 TB); USB (up to 8 TB)	
Storage expansion	External via USB	Yes (up to 8 TB)			With Modifications	Yes (up to 8 TB and can only play PS4 and PlayStation VR games directly. PS5 games can only be stored)	
Sources							

== 1994–2006 ==
Model		PlayStation	PlayStation 2	PlayStation 2 Slimline	PlayStation 3	PlayStation 3 Slim	PlayStation 3 Super Slim
Image							
Key dates	First released	December 1994	March 2000	October 2004	November 2006	September 2009	September 2012
Key dates	Discontinued	March 2006	October 2004	January 2013	October 2009	September 2012	May 2017
Dimensions (WxHxD)		275 mm × 63.5 mm × 190 mm (10.8 in × 2.5 in × 7.5 in)	302 mm × 78 mm × 183 mm (11.9 in × 3.1 in × 7.2 in)	231 mm × 152 mm × 28 mm (9.1 in × 6.0 in × 1.1 in)	325 mm × 98 mm × 274 mm (12.8 in × 3.9 in × 10.8 in)	290 mm × 65 mm × 290 mm (11.4 in × 2.6 in × 11.4 in)	290 mm × 60 mm × 230 mm (11.4 in × 2.4 in × 9.1 in)
Weight		1.5 kg (3.3 lb)	2.2 kg (4.9 lb)	900 g (1.98 lb)	4.99 kg (11 lb)	3.2 kg (7.1 lb)	1.95 kg (4.3 lb)
Storage	Capacity	128 KB	8 MB Memory Card, 40 GB HDD	8 MB Memory Card	20/60/80/160 GB	120/160/250/320 GB	12/250/500 GB
Storage	Type	Memory Cards	Memory Cards, HDD	Memory Cards	HDD		
Storage	Bandwidth	—	22-66 MB/s	—	50-100 MB/s		
CPU	Cores	1	1 two-way superscalar in-order RISC CPU core		1 Power Processor Element (Primary), 8 Synergistic Processing Units (Secondary)		
CPU	Threads	?	?		?		
CPU	Clock speed	33.9 MHz	294.9 MHz	299 MHz	3.2 GHz		
GPU	Cores	?	?		?		
GPU	Threads	?	?		?		
GPU	Clock speed	53 MHz	147 MHz		550 MHz		
GPU	Ray tracing	No					
Memory		2 MB System RAM 1 MB VRAM	32 MB System RAM 4 MB VRAM		256 MB XDRAM 256 MB VRAM	256 MB XDRAM 256 MB GDDR3 SDRAM	256 MB XDR System RAM 256 MB GDDR3 VRAM
Ports		1x Serial I/O 1x Parallel I/O (excluding SCPH 900x)	2x USB 1.1 1x i.LINK (excluding SCPH 5000x)	2x USB 2.0	4x USB 2.0 (CECHAxx-CECHExx) 2x USB 2.0 (CECHGxx-CECHQxx)	2x USB 2.0	
Power supply		15 W	50 W	24 W	380 W	250 W	190 W
Network	Ethernet	—	Dial-up or broadband with Adapter via PCMCIA slot (SCPH 1000x-SCPH 1800x) via Expansion Bay (SCPH 3000x-SCPH 5000x)	Dial-up or broadband (Built-in)	Gigabit Ethernet		
Network	Wi-Fi	—	—	—	802.11b/g Wi-Fi (excluding CECHBxx)	802.11b/g Wi-Fi	
Network	Bluetooth	—	—	—	Bluetooth 2.0		
Storage expansion	Upgradable	—	Yes	No	Yes	Yes	Yes
Storage expansion	Expandable	Memory Cards	Memory Cards, HDD via Expansion Bay (SCPH 3000x-SCPH 5000x only)	Memory Cards	CECHAxx-CECHExx: Flash memory card readers (excluding CECHBxx), USB flash drive CECHGxx-CECHQxx: USB flash drive	USB flash drive	
Storage expansion	External via USB	—	No	No	Yes	Yes	Yes
Sources							
