= Radeon 5000 series =

Radeon 5000 series may refer to two different series of graphics processing units (GPUs) developed by Advanced Micro Devices:

- Radeon RX 5000 series, released in 2019
- Radeon HD 5000 series, released in 2009 under the ATI brand name
