= Pumping (computer systems) =

A comparison between single data rate, double data rate, and quad data rate.

Pumping, when referring to computer systems, is an informal term for transmitting a data signal more than one time per clock signal.

== Overview ==
Early types of system memory (RAM), such as SDRAM, transmitted data on only the rising edge of the clock signal. With the advent of double data rate synchronous dynamic RAM or DDR SDRAM, the data was transmitted on both rising and falling edges. However, quad-pumping has been used for a while for the front-side bus (FSB) of a computer system. This works by transmitting data at the rising edge, peak, falling edge, and trough of each clock cycle. Intel computer systems (and others) use this technology to reach effective FSB speeds of 1600 MT/s (million transfers per second), even though the FSB clock speed is only 400 MHz (cycles per second). A phase-locked loop in the CPU then multiplies the FSB clock by a factor in order to get the CPU speed.

Example: A Core 2 Duo E6600 processor is listed as 2.4 GHz with a 1066 MHz FSB. The FSB is known to be quad-pumped, so its clock frequency is 1066/4 = 266 MHz. Therefore, the CPU multiplier is 2400/266, or 9×. The DDR2 RAM that it is compatible with is known to be double-pumped and to have an Input/Output Bus twice that of the true FSB frequency (effectively transferring data 4 times a clock cycle), so to run the system synchronously (see front-side bus) the type of RAM that is appropriate is quadruple 266 MHz, or DDR2-1066 (PC2-8400 or PC2-8500, depending on the manufacturer's labeling.).
