= Powertech Technology =

Taiwanese electronics company

Powertech Technology Inc. (PTI; Chinese: 力成科技; 6239. TW) is a Taiwanese semiconductor assembly, packaging and testing company.

In 2010 the company entered a strategic alliance with Japan's Elpida Memory and Taiwan's chip foundry United Microelectronics Corporation to develop advanced semiconductor packaging technology.

The company is purported to be manufacturing Apple Inc.'s Apple S1 chip for their recently announced Apple Watch.
