= Radeon RX 5000 series =

Series of video cards

AMD Radeon RX 5000 series
- Release date: July 7, 2019 (6 years ago)
- Codename: Navi
- Architecture: RDNA
- Transistors: 6.400M (Navi 14); 10.300M (Navi 10)
- Fabrication process: TSMC N7 (FinFET)

Cards
- Entry-level: Radeon RX 5300M; Radeon RX 5300; Radeon RX 5300 XT
- Mid-range: Radeon RX 5500M; Radeon RX 5500; Radeon RX 5500 XT; Radeon RX 5600M; Radeon RX 5600; Radeon RX 5600 XT
- High-end: Radeon RX 5700M; Radeon RX 5700; Radeon RX 5700 XT; Radeon RX 5700 XT 50th Anniversary Edition

API support
- Direct3D: Direct3D 12.0 (feature level 12_1); Shader Model 6.7
- OpenCL: OpenCL 2.1
- OpenGL: OpenGL 4.6
- Vulkan: Vulkan 1.3; SPIR-V

History
- Predecessor: Radeon RX Vega series
- Successor: Radeon RX 6000 series

Support status
- Supported

The Radeon RX 5000 series is a series of graphics processors developed by AMD, based on their RDNA architecture. The series is targeting the mainstream mid to high-end segment and is the successor to the Radeon RX Vega series. The launch occurred on July 7, 2019. It is manufactured using TSMC's 7 nm FinFET semiconductor fabrication process.

== Architecture ==
The Navi GPUs are the first AMD GPUs to use the new RDNA architecture, whose compute units have been redesigned to improve efficiency and instructions per clock (IPC). It features a multi-level cache hierarchy, which offers higher performance, lower latency, and less power consumption compared to the previous series. Navi also features an updated memory controller with GDDR6 support.

The encoding stack has changed from using Unified Video Decoder and Video Coding Engine, to using Video Core Next. VCN was previously used in the GCN 5th generation (Vega) implementation in Raven Ridge, though not utilized in other Vega product lines.

=== Vulkan (API) ===
Vulkan 1.2 is supported with Adrenalin 20.1.2 and Linux Mesa3D 20.0.0.

Vulkan 1.3 is supported with Adrenalin 22.1.2 and Linux Mesa3D 22.0.0.

Vulkan 1.4 is supported with Adrenalin 25.5.1 and Linux Mesa3D 25.0.0.

=== Resizable BAR support ===
PCIe Resizable BAR (RBAR, branded as Smart Access Memory, SAM) is supported with Adrenalin 21.9.1 or higher.

This feature (first available on RX 6000 series) is now supported on RX 5000 series GPUs.

== Radeon RX 5000 series features ==
AMD Radeon RX 5000 series features include:

- New RDNA microarchitecture
- TSMC 7nm N7 manufacturing process
- DirectX 12.0 support
- GDDR6 memory
- PCIe 4.0 support
- PCIe Resizable BAR support
- AMD MGPU support
- AMD FreeSync support
- DisplayPort 1.4a
- HDMI 2.0b
- Video Core Next 2.0

== Products ==
=== Desktop ===
Model (Code name)	Release Date & Price	Architecture & fab	Transistors & die size	Core		Fillrate (Note: Boost values (if available) are stated below the base value in italic.) (Note: Texture fillrate is calculated as the number of Texture Mapping Units multiplied by the base (or boost) core clock speed.) (Note: Pixel fillrate is calculated as the number of Render Output Units multiplied by the base (or boost) core clock speed.)		Processing power (Note: Precision performance is calculated from the base (or boost) core clock speed based on a FMA operation.) (GFLOPS)			Memory				TBP	Bus interface
Model (Code name)	Release Date & Price	Architecture & fab	Transistors & die size	Config (Note: Unified shaders : Texture mapping units : Render output units and Compute units (CU))	Clock (MHz)	Texture (GT/s)	Pixel (GP/s)	Half	Single	Double	Size (GB)	Bandwidth (GB/s)	Bus type & width	Clock (MT/s)	TBP	Bus interface
Radeon RX 5300 (Navi 14)	Aug 28, 2020; OEM	RDNA; TSMC N7	6.4×10^{9} 158 mm^{2}	1408:88:32; 22 CU	1327; 1645	116.8; 144.8	42.46; 52.64	7,474; 9,265	3,737; 4,632	233.5; 289.5	3	168	GDDR6; 96-bit	14000	100 W	PCIe 4.0 ×8
Radeon RX 5300 XT (Navi 14)	Oct 7, 2019; OEM	RDNA; TSMC N7	6.4×10^{9} 158 mm^{2}	1408:88:32; 22 CU	1670; 1845	146.7; 162.4	53.44; 59.04	9,405; 10,390	4,703; 5,196	293.9; 324.7	4	112	GDDR5; 128-bit	7000	100 W	PCIe 4.0 ×8
Radeon RX 5500 (Navi 14)	Oct 7, 2019; OEM	RDNA; TSMC N7	6.4×10^{9} 158 mm^{2}	1408:88:32; 22 CU	1670; 1845	146.7; 162.4	53.44; 59.04	9,405; 10,390	4,703; 5,196	293.9; 324.7	4	224	GDDR6; 128-bit	14000	150 W	PCIe 4.0 ×8
Radeon RX 5500 XT (Navi 14)	Dec 7, 2019 $169 USD (4GB) $199 USD (8GB)	RDNA; TSMC N7	6.4×10^{9} 158 mm^{2}	1408:88:32; 22 CU	1717; 1845	151.1; 162.4	54.94; 59.04	9,670; 10,390	4,835; 5,196	302.2; 324.7	4; 8	224	GDDR6; 128-bit	14000	130 W	PCIe 4.0 ×8
Radeon RX 5600 (Navi 10)	Jan 21, 2020; OEM	RDNA; TSMC N7	10.3×10^{9} 251 mm^{2}	2048:128:64; 32 CU	1375; 1560	176.0; 199.7	88.00; 99.84	11,264; 12,780	5,632; 6,390	352.0; 399.4	6	288	GDDR6; 192-bit	12000	150 W	PCIe 4.0 ×16
Radeon RX 5600 XT (Navi 10)	Jan 21, 2020 $279 USD	RDNA; TSMC N7	10.3×10^{9} 251 mm^{2}	2304:144:64; 36 CU	1375; 1560	198.0; 224.6	88.00; 99.84	12,672; 14,377	6,336; 7,188	396.0; 449.3	6	288; 336	GDDR6; 192-bit	12000; 14000	160 W	PCIe 4.0 ×16
Radeon RX 5700 (Navi 10)	Jul 7, 2019 $349 USD	RDNA; TSMC N7	10.3×10^{9} 251 mm^{2}	2304:144:64; 36 CU	1465; 1725	210.9; 248.4	93.73; 110.4	13,501; 15,900	6,751; 7,949	421.9; 496.8	8	448	GDDR6; 256-bit	14000	180 W	PCIe 4.0 ×16
Radeon RX 5700 XT (Navi 10)	Jul 7, 2019 $399 USD	RDNA; TSMC N7	10.3×10^{9} 251 mm^{2}	2560:160:64; 40 CU	1605; 1905	256.8; 304.8	102.7; 121.9	16,435; 19,510	8,218; 9,754	513.6; 609.6	8	448	GDDR6; 256-bit	14000	225 W	PCIe 4.0 ×16
Radeon RX 5700 XT 50th Anniversary Edition (Navi 10)	Jul 7, 2019 $449 USD	RDNA; TSMC N7	10.3×10^{9} 251 mm^{2}	2560:160:64; 40 CU	1680; 1980	268.8; 316.8	107.5; 126.7	17,203; 20,276	8,602; 10,138	537.6; 633.6	8	448	GDDR6; 256-bit	14000	235 W	PCIe 4.0 ×16

=== Mobile ===
Model (Code name)	Release date	Architecture & fab	Transistors & die size	Core		Fillrate (Note: Boost values (if available) are stated below the base value in italic.) (Note: Texture fillrate is calculated as the number of Texture Mapping Units multiplied by the base (or boost) core clock speed.) (Note: Pixel fillrate is calculated as the number of Render Output Units multiplied by the base (or boost) core clock speed.)		Processing power (Note: Precision performance is calculated from the base (or boost) core clock speed based on a FMA operation.) (GFLOPS)			Memory				TDP	Bus interface
Model (Code name)	Release date	Architecture & fab	Transistors & die size	Config (Note: Unified shaders : Texture mapping units : Render output units and Compute units (CU))	Clock (MHz)	Texture (GT/s)	Pixel (GP/s)	Half	Single	Double	Size (GB)	Bandwidth (GB/s)	Bus type & width	Clock (MT/s)	TDP	Bus interface
Radeon RX 5300M (Navi 14)	Nov 13, 2019	RDNA; TSMC N7	6.4×10^{9} 158 mm^{2}	1408:88:32; 22 CU	1000; 1445	88.0; 127.2	32.0; 46.2	5,632; 8,138	2,816; 4,069	176.0; 254.3	3	168	GDDR6; 96-bit	14000	65 W	PCIe 4.0 ×8
Radeon RX 5500M (Navi 14)	Oct 7, 2019	RDNA; TSMC N7	6.4×10^{9} 158 mm^{2}	1408:88:32; 22 CU	1375; 1645	121.0; 144.8	44.0; 52.6	7,744; 9,265	3,872; 4,632	242.0; 289.5	4	224	GDDR6; 128-bit	14000	85 W	PCIe 4.0 ×8
Radeon RX 5600M (Navi 10)	Jul 7, 2020	RDNA; TSMC N7	10.3×10^{9} 251 mm^{2}	2304:144:64; 36 CU	1035; 1265	149.0; 182.2	66.2; 80.9	9,539; 11,658	4,769; 5,829	298.0; 364.3	6	288	GDDR6; 192-bit	12000	85 W	PCIe 4.0 ×16
Radeon RX 5700M (Navi 10)	Mar 1, 2020	RDNA; TSMC N7	10.3×10^{9} 251 mm^{2}	2304:144:64; 36 CU	1465; 1720	210.9; 247.7	93.7; 110.1	13,501; 15,852	6,751; 7,926	421.9; 495.4	8	384	GDDR6; 256-bit	12000	120 W	PCIe 4.0 ×16

=== Comparison of 5700 XT models ===
Comparison of non-reference Radeon RX 5700 XT model video cards, from the AMD Radeon RX 5000 series.
The dimensions of modern graphics cards frequently exceeds the dimensions specified in the PCIe standard. Particularly, no card model fits in the specified height limit of 107 mm.

Card	Length (mm)	Height (mm)	Thickness (mm)	Fans	Power
AMD Radeon RX 5700 XT (all ref. models)	272	111	36	1x 70 mm	225 W
ASRock RX 5700 XT Challenger D OC	281	137 (Note: This number should be lower, as this card's height is apparently measured differently from others. The cited size includes the height of the metal bracket.)	42	2x 100 mm	?
ASRock RX 5700 XT Challenger Pro OC					
ASRock RX 5700 XT Phantom D OC					
ASRock RX 5700 XT Phantom Elite OC					
ASRock RX 5700 XT TAICHI OC+					
ASUS RX 5700 XT DUAL EVO OC					
ASUS RX 5700 XT ROG Strix OC	305	130	54 (2.7 slot)	3x	235 W
ASUS RX 5700 XT TUF X3 OC	269	125	54 (2.7 slot)	3x 80 mm	>225 W
ASUS RX 5700 XT TUF X3 EVO OC	282.6	128.5	53.8 (2.7 slot)	3x	>225 W
BIOSTAR RX 5700 XT Extreme					
Dataland RX 5700 XT X-Serial Ares					
Dataland RX 5700 XT X-Serial Demon					
Dataland RX 5700 XT X-Serial Warrior					
GIGABYTE RX 5700 XT AORUS					
GIGABYTE RX 5700 XT GAMING					
GIGABYTE RX 5700 XT GAMING OC	279.9	113.4	49.6 (2.5 slot)	3x 80 mm	?
KUROUTOSHIKOU RX 5700 XT V2					
KUROUTOSHIKOU RX 5700 XT ProRender					
MSI RX 5700 XT Evoke					
MSI RX 5700 XT Evoke OC	254	129	51	2x 90 mm	?
MSI RX 5700 XT Gaming					
MSI RX 5700 XT Gaming X	297	140	58	2x	225 W
MSI RX 5700 XT Mech					
MSI RX 5700 XT Mech OC	232	126	46	2x	?
PowerColor RX 5700 XT	230	111	41	2x	225 W
PowerColor RX 5700 XT Red Devil	300	132	53	3x 90 mm	?
PowerColor RX 5700 XT Red Dragon	240	132	41	2x 100 mm	?
Sapphire RX 5700 XT PULSE	254	135	46.5 (2.3 slot)	2x 95 mm	241 W
Sapphire RX 5700 XT Nitro+	306	135	49 (2.5 slot)	2x 95 + 1x 87 mm	265 W
XFX RX 5700 XT RAW II	278	140	58	2x 100 mm	?
XFX RX 5700 XT THICC II	293	130	55	2x 100 mm	?
XFX RX 5700 XT THICC II Ultra					
XFX RX 5700 XT THICC III Ultra					
XFX RX 5700 XT Double Dissipation					
XFX RX 5700 XT Triple Dissipation					

== See also ==
- Radeon RX 6000 series
- Radeon RX 7000 series
- Radeon Pro
- AMD Instinct
- RDNA (microarchitecture)
- List of AMD graphics processing units
