= Micron Memory Japan =

Japanese memory (DRAM) company

Micron Memory Japan, K.K.
- Native name: マイクロンメモリジャパン株式会社
- Type: Subsidiary
- Industry: Semiconductor industry
- Predecessor: Elpida Memory, Inc.
- Founded: 1999
- Headquarters: Yaesu, Chūō, Tokyo, Japan
- Products: DRAM
- Number of employees: 4013
- Parent: Micron Technology
- Website: jp.micron.com

Micron Memory Japan, K.K. (Japanese: マイクロンメモリジャパン株式会社; Micron Memory Japan Kabushiki-gaisha (MMJ)) is a Japanese subsidiary of Micron Technology. It was formerly known as Elpida Memory, Inc. (エルピーダメモリ株式会社, Erupīda Memori Kabushiki-gaisha) established in 1999 that developed, designed, manufactured and sold dynamic random-access memory (DRAM) products. It was also a semiconductor foundry. With headquarters in Yaesu, Chūō, Tokyo, Japan, it was initially formed under the name NEC Hitachi Memory in 1999 by the merger of the Hitachi and NEC DRAM businesses. In the following year it took on the name Elpida. In 2003, Elpida took over the Mitsubishi DRAM business. In 2004, it listed its shares in the first section of the Tokyo Stock Exchange. In 2012, those shares were delisted as a result of its bankruptcy. In 2013, Elpida was acquired by Micron Technology. On February 28, 2014, Elpida changed its name to Micron Memory Japan and Elpida Akita changed its name to Micron Akita, Inc.

== History ==
Former logo

Elpida Memory was founded in 1999 as a merger of NEC's and Hitachi's DRAM operations and began development operations for DRAM products in 2000. Both companies also spun off their other semiconductor operations into Renesas.

In 2001, the company began construction of its 300mm wafer fabrication plant. Later that year, it began sales operations in domestic markets.

In 2002, armed with the Sherman Antitrust Act, the United States Department of Justice began a probe into the activities of dynamic random access memory (DRAM) manufacturers. US computer makers, including Dell and Gateway, claimed that inflated DRAM pricing was causing lost profits and hindering their effectiveness in the marketplace. To date, five manufacturers have pleaded guilty to their involvement in an international price-fixing conspiracy including Hynix, Infineon, Micron Technology, Samsung, and Elpida. Micron Technology was not fined for its involvement due to co-operation with investigators.

In 2003, the company took over Mitsubishi Electric Corporation's DRAM operations and employed Mitsubishi development engineers.

In 2004, Elpida Memory went public and was listed on the Tokyo Stock Exchange.

In 2006, the company established Akita Elpida to take on the development of advanced back-end technology processes.

In March 2006, Elpida reported consolidated sales of 241,500,000,000 Japanese yen. It employed 3196 people.

The company received 140 billion yen in financial aid and loans from the Japanese government and banks in 2009 due to the 2008 financial crisis.

On April 3, 2010, Elpida Memory sold ¥18.5billion worth of shares to Kingston Technology

On April 22, 2010, Elpida announced it had developed the world's first four-gigabit DDR3 SDRAM. Based on a 40 nm process, this DRAM was said to use about thirty percent less power compared to two 40 nm process two-gigabit DDR3 SDRAMs. It was to operate at both standard DDR3 1.5 V and 1.35 V to further reduce power consumption.

In July 2011, Elpida announced that it planned to raise $987 million by selling shares and bonds. In August 2011, Elpida claimed to be the first memory maker to begin sampling 25 nm DRAMs.

On February 27, 2012, Elpida filed for bankruptcy. With liabilities of 448 billion yen (US$5.5 billion), the company's bankruptcy was Japan's largest since Japan Airlines bankrupted in January 2010. The company suffered from both strong yen and a sharp drop of DRAM prices as a result of stagnant demand of personal computers and disruption of computer production caused by flooding of HDD factories in Thailand. DRAM prices plunged to a record low in 2011 as the price of the benchmark DDR3 2-gigabit DRAM declined 85%. Elpida was the third largest DRAM maker, held 18 percent of the market by revenue in 2011.

On March 28, 2012, Elpida was delisted from the Tokyo Stock Exchange. At the time, Elpida was one of the suppliers of SDRAM components for the A6 processor in the Apple iPhone 5.

In February 2013, Tokyo court and Elpida creditors approved an acquisition by Micron Technology.

The company became a fully owned subsidiary of Micron Technology on July 31, 2013.

Effective February 28, 2014, Elpida changed its name to Micron Memory Japan and Elpida Akita changed its name to Micron Akita, Inc.

In August 2017, an agreement was signed with Power Technology Inc. for the acquisition of the majority stakes in Micron Akita, Inc. as well as Tera Probe Inc. from Micron Technology Inc.

In September 2022, the Japanese government provided Micron Technology Inc. a subsidy of $320 million for the development of advanced memory chips at the Hiroshima plant. In May 2023, it was announced that Micron Technology would invest up to $3.7 billion for extreme ultraviolet (EUV) technology with support from the Japanese government. In October 2023, the government once again approved a $1.3 billion subsidy for the Hiroshima chip factory.

== Products ==
- DDR5 SDRAM
- DDR4 SDRAM
- DDR3 SDRAM
- DDR2 SDRAM
- Mobile RAM
- GDDR7
- GDDR5
- XDR DRAM

== Locations ==
Micron has two design centers, one manufacturing plant/technology development site, and two sales offices in Japan:

Micron's offices in Japan
Companies	Roles	Name	Train station	Municipality
Micron Memory Japan, K.K. (MMJ)	Design (DRAM)	Hashimoto Engineering Center	Minami-Hashimoto	Sagamihara, Kanagawa
Micron Memory Japan, K.K. (MMJ)	Design (NAND flash memory)	Kamata Office	Kamata	Ōta, Tokyo
Micron Memory Japan, K.K. (MMJ)	Manufacturing Technology Development	Hiroshima Plant; Hiroshima Development Center	Higashi-Hiroshima	Higashihiroshima, Hiroshima
Micron Memory Japan, K.K. (MMJ) Micron Japan, Ltd. (MJP)	Sales	Tokyo Office	Shinagawa	Minato, Tokyo
Micron Japan, Ltd. (MJP)	Sales	Osaka Office	Osaka Business Park; Kyobashi	Osaka

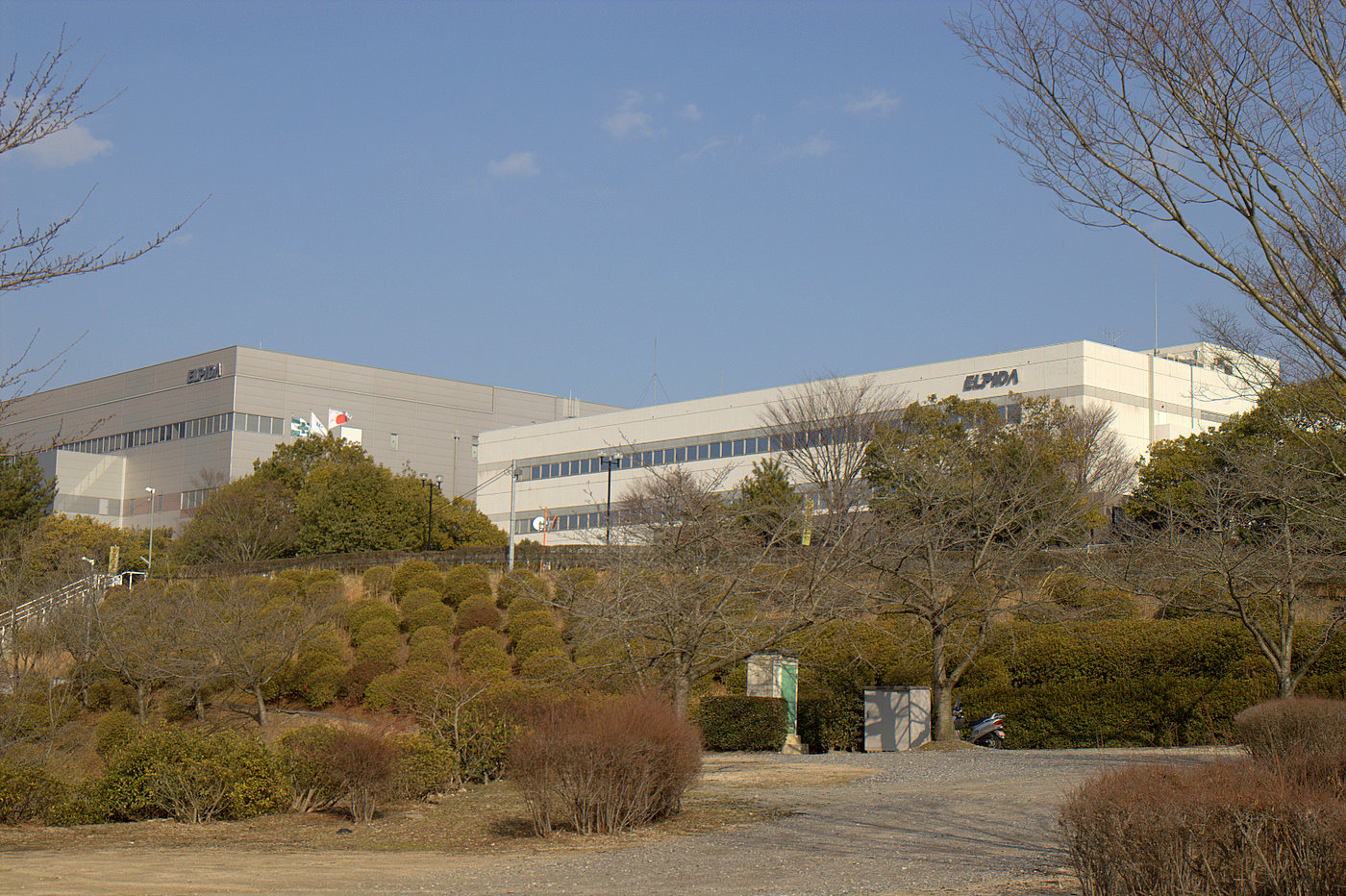
The Hiroshima Plant is Micron Memory Japan's main manufacturing fab and technology development site, which was acquired from Elpida.

The Hiroshima Plant is key to Micron's efforts to develop low-power DRAM products essential to smartphones and other mobile devices. Once these products achieve yield and performance targets (optimal cost structure, quality and lower end-to-end product cycle time) in Hiroshima, the manufacturing process can then be transferred to other sites.

Micron's realignment of the Japanese operations included the following:

- $2 billion investment in Hiroshima to enhance competitive capabilities
- Acquisition of test and probe personnel in Hiroshima from Tera Probe, Inc. (株式会社テラプローブ, Kabushiki-gaisha Tera Probe) to bring these capabilities in-house
- Sell-off of its test and assembly capabilities in Micron Akita to Powertech Technology, Inc. (PTI), a Taiwanese semiconductor assembly, packaging and testing company
- Sell-off of its equity stake in Tera Probe to PTI

With these changes, Micron's DRAM test and assembly capabilities would be based in Hiroshima and Taiwan.

== See also ==
- Renesas Electronics
- Numonyx
