= Telephone numbers in Sri Lanka =

Sri Lanka

- Location of Sri Lanka (dark green)
- Country: Sri Lanka
- Continent: Asia
- Regulator: Telecommunications Regulatory Commission of Sri Lanka
- Numbering plan type: Open
- NSN length: 7
- Format: 0AA-NNN NNNN (10 digits)
- Country code: +94
- International access: 00
- Long-distance: 0

== Emergency Services ==
Code	Purpose	Organization
101	Emergency Cyber Security Coordination Centre to handle cyber incidents reported by public	Sri Lanka Computer Emergency Readiness Team (SLCERT)
105	Dedicated maritime incident hotline	Sri Lanka Navy Headqurters
106	For minimize response time and enhance coordination in maritime distress situations	Sri Lanka Coast Guard
107	Police Emergency Service for Northern and Eastern Provinces in Tamil language	Sri Lanka Police - Wanni Range
109	For the public to report incidents related to abuse of Children and Women	The Bureau for the Prevention of Abuse of Children and Women
110	Emergency and Rescue Services	By Regional Offices for Emergency and Rescue Services
112	Police Emergency Service Hot Line	Police Emergency Service
113	Sri Lanka Army	Sri Lanka Army Head Quarters
114	To manage eventualities pertaining to national security and disaster relief operations	Sri Lanka Army
115	National Air Defence Network	Air Defence Command and Control Centre, SLAF Mirigama
116	For the Air Defence Operation Centre (ADOC) to receive Air Defence alerts from the general public	Sri Lanka Air Force
117	Disaster Management Call Centre	Disaster Management Centre
118	National Help Desk	Ministry of Public Security
119	Police Emergency Service	Sri Lanka Police Department
1990	Emergency Pre–Hospital Care Ambulance Service	Ministry of Health

=== More Info ===
3 Digits Short Codes for Special Services in Sri Lanka

== 4 Digit Short Codes ==
- Short Codes in 19XX Range for Government Organizations

 4 Digits Short Codes for Services in Sri Lanka 

- Short Codes in 13XX Range for Private Sector Organizations

 4 Digits Short Codes for Services in Sri Lanka 

=== Operator Hotlines and WhatsApp chatting numbers ===
Code	Operator
1755	Airtel by Dialog
1777	Dialog
1788	Hutch
1212	SLTMobitel
1717	SLTMobitel
WhatsApp chatting numbers
+94 755 555 555	Airtel by Dialog
+94 777 678 678	Dialog
+94 788 777 111	Hutch
+94 710 755 777	SLTMobitel (Mobile services)

== Fixed line (landline) codes ==
Fixed Telephone numbers in Sri Lanka consist of 10-digits in the xxx y zzzzzz format where:

xxx	represents the area code. All area codes begin with 0. (0xx y zzzzzz)
y	represents the operator code for fixed (landline) numbers.
zzzzzz	represents the main telephone number of six digits.

=== Area codes ===
Province	District	Area	Area Code
Western	Colombo	Colombo	011
Western	Colombo	Avissawella	036
Western	Gampaha	Negombo	031
Western	Gampaha	Gampaha	033
Western	Kalutara	Panadura	038
Western	Kalutara	Kalutara	034
Central	Kandy	Nawalapitiya	054
Central	Kandy	Kandy	081
Central	Nuwara Eliya	Hatton	051
Central	Nuwara Eliya	Nuwara Eliya	052
Central	Matale	Matale	066
Southern	Galle	Galle	091
Southern	Matara	Matara	041
Southern	Hambantota	Hambantota	047
North Western	Puttalam	Chilaw	032
North Western	Kurunegala	Kurunegala	037
Northern	Jaffna	Jaffna	021
Northern	Mannar	Mannar	023
Northern	Vavuniya	Vavuniya	024
Eastern	Ampara	Ampara	063
Eastern	Ampara	Kalmunai	067
Eastern	Batticaloa	Batticaloa	065
Eastern	Trincomalee	Trincomalee	026
North Central	Anuradhapura	Anuradhapura	025
North Central	Polonnaruwa	Polonnaruwa	027
Uva	Monaragala	Monaragala	055
Uva	Badulla	Badulla	055
Uva	Badulla	Bandarawela	057
Sabaragamuwa	Ratnapura	Ratnapura	045
Sabaragamuwa	Kegalle	Kegalle	035

=== Operator Codes for Fixed LTE/Fibre/Copper ===
Area code	Operator code	Operator	Type
0xx	2	SLTMobitel	Fixed Fibre/Copper
0xx	3	SLTMobitel	Fixed wireless LTE
0xx	4	Dialog	Fixed wireless LTE
0xx	7	Dialog	Fixed wireless LTE

== Mobile operator codes ==
Code	Operator
070	SLTMobitel
071	SLTMobitel
072	Hutch (previously used by Etisalat)
074	Dialog (075 is currently using under Airtel brand)
075	Dialog (075 is currently using under Airtel brand)
076	Dialog (075 is currently using under Airtel brand)
077	Dialog (075 is currently using under Airtel brand)
078	Hutch

Mobile numbers in Sri Lanka consist of 10-digits in the xxx zzzzzzz format where:

- "xxx" represents the mobile operator code when contacting a mobile number. All mobile operator codes begin with 07.
- "zzzzzzz" represents the main telephone number of seven digits.

== Dialling into Sri Lanka ==
=== To fixed line ===
To dial into Sri Lanka from abroad callers must use the +94 xx y zzzzzz format where:

+	is the international call prefix (usually 00).
94	is Sri Lanka's country code.
xx	represents the area code. (i.e. omitting the leading 0 used when calling inside Sri Lanka).
y	represents the operator code.
zzzzzz	represents the main telephone number of six digits.

=== To mobile line ===
To dial into Sri Lanka from abroad callers must use the +94 xx zzzzzzz format where:

+	is the international call prefix (usually 00).
94	is Sri Lanka's country code.
xx	represents the mobile operator code (i.e. omitting the leading 0 used when calling inside Sri Lanka. ).
zzzzzzz	represents the main telephone number of seven digits.

== See also ==
- Telecommunications in Sri Lanka
- ISO 3166-2:LK
- Postal codes in Sri Lanka
- Subdivisions of Sri Lanka
- Registered Public Pay Phone Services
