= Telecommunications in Sri Lanka =

Telecommunications in Sri Lanka commenced in 1858 after the first telegraphic circuit between Colombo and Galle was commenced. The sector continues to grow in the modern times.

== Telephone ==
Landlines in use:▼2,732,286 (March, 2026)

Mobile Phones in use: ▼29,678,856 (March, 2026)

- Teledensity (Fixed Phones per 100 inhabitants) :▼7.1 (December, 2025)
- Mobile Subscription per 100 people :▼126.7 (December, 2025)

=== Domestic ===
The national trunk network consists mostly of digital microwave radio relay and fiber-optic links are now in use in the Colombo City and all major cities and towns

=== International ===
Two submarine cables to India and the Maldives; one Satellite earth stations - Intelsat (Indian Ocean) (2009)

=== Broadband Internet access ===
==== Fixed Broadband Service Providers ====
Operator	Technology
Dialog	LTE TDD, VoLTE, FTTH, Wi-Fi
SLTMobitel	ADSL2+, VDSL2, LTE TDD, VoLTE, FTTH, Wi-Fi

==== Mobile Broadband Service Providers ====
Operator	Technology
Dialog	GPRS, EDGE, HSPA+, LTE , LTE-A, VoLTE, VoWiFi, 5G , VoNR (Trial)
Hutch	GPRS, EDGE, UMTS, HSPA, HSPA+, DC-HSPA+, LTE FDD, VoLTE
SLTMobitel	GPRS, EDGE, UMTS, HSPA, HSPA+, DC-HSPA+, LTE FDD, LTE-A, VoLTE, VoWiFi (Trial), 5G ,VoNR (Trial)

== Internet ==
The history of the internet in Sri Lanka began with the launch of the Lanka Education and Research Network (LEARN) in 1992. The network was only made available to educational and research communities. In the 1985/1986 period with the use of an old TRS 80 model which ran Xenix, computer engineers and scholars were able to demonstrate a remote login from University of Moratuwa (UoM) which connected a computer in University of Colombo for the first time.

- Fixed Broadband Subscriptions : ▲1,810,657 (June, 2020)
- Mobile Broadband Subscriptions : ▲11,684,649 (June, 2020)

=== Internet Speed ===
- 4G LTE Mobile Broadband : Download : ▲21.57 Mbit/s to 300 Mbit/s Upload : ▲10.23 Mbit/s to 45 Mbit/s
- 4G LTE Fixed Broadband : Download : ▲28.65 Mbit/s to 150 Mbit/s Upload : ▲15.41 Mbit/s to 30 Mbit/s
- Fiber Optics : Download : ▲100 Mbit/s to 1000 Mbit/s Upload : ▲50 Mbit/s to 500 Mbit/s data capped

== Other Communication ==
Postal Service: Sri Lanka Post

Radio broadcast stations: AM 15, FM 54, SW 5

Television broadcast stations: 19 (2009)

Satellite Earth Stations located: Padukka and Colombo

Internet service providers: 9

Country code / Top-level domain: +94/LK

== Telecommunications Regulatory Environment in Sri Lanka ==
LIRNEasia's Telecommunications Regulatory Environment (TRE) index, which summarizes stakeholders' perception on certain TRE dimensions, provides insight into how conducive the environment is for further development and progress. The most recent survey was conducted in July 2008 in eight Asian countries, including Bangladesh, India, Indonesia, Sri Lanka, Maldives, Pakistan, Thailand, and the Philippines. The tool measured seven dimensions: i) market entry; ii) access to scarce resources; iii) interconnection; iv) tariff regulation; v) anti-competitive practices; and vi) universal services; vii) quality of service, for the fixed, mobile and broadband sectors.

In Sri Lanka, the mobile sector receives higher scores than the fixed sector for all dimensions excepting interconnection. The broadband sector lags behind both the fixed and mobile sectors in all but one of the parameters (regulation of anti-competitive practices). What also emerges in the results illustrated above is that all the sectors – other than mobile sector USOs – fall below the 5.00 average performance level.

== Telecommunication research in Sri Lanka ==
Centre for Telecommunication Research is a research-based institute at the Sri Lanka Technological Campus (SLTC) to carry out innovative, collaborative and industry-sponsored research works in wireless communications and networking. Research activities at the CTR, both fundamental and applied, mainly focus on technologies related to the physical, data-link and network layers of communication systems, and optical communication.

== Product ==
Sri Lanka initiated to produce telecommunication, specially smartphones with the collaboration of foreign companies that already in the leading market.

== See also ==
- List of Sri Lanka Telephone Codes
