= K35 =

K35 may refer to:

- K-35 (Kansas highway), former
- Beechcraft K35 Bonanza, an American civil utility aircraft
- Dialog K35, a smartphone
- Die Schuldigkeit des ersten Gebots, a sacred musical play by Wolfgang Amadeus Mozart
- HSwMS Karlstad (K35), a corvette of the Swedish Navy
- Mamostong Kangri, a mountain
- Potassium-35, an isotope of potassium
