= SSTL =

SSTL may refer to:

- Stainless steel, a corrosion-resistant steel alloy
- Stub Series Terminated Logic, a group of electrical standards for driving transmission lines
- Surrey Satellite Technology, a British satellite manufacturer
- Sistema Shyam TeleServices Limited, a joint venture between Sistema (LSE-SSA) of Russia and Shyam Group of India, to form MTS India
