= K45 =

K45 may refer to:

- K-45 (Kansas highway), now part of U.S. Route 56
- Dialog K45, a Sri Lankan smartphone
- HMS Convolvulus (K45), a corvette of the Royal Navy
- INS Vibhuti (K45), a corvette of the Indian Navy
- Junkers K 45, a German transport aircraft
- Potassium-45, an isotope of potassium
- Symphony No. 7 (Mozart), by Wolfgang Amadeus Mozart
