= Dialog i43 =

Smartphone model

- Brand: Dialog Axiata
- Manufacturer: innos
- Type: Touchscreen smartphone
- Series: Dialog i series
- Availability by region: Sri Lanka
- Predecessor: Dialog i35
- Related: Dialog K35; Dialog K45
- Compatible networks: 2G (850/900/1800/1900 MHz); 3G (WCDMA 2100 MHz)
- Form factor: Slate
- Dimensions: 126.9×69.5×10.2 mm (5.00×2.74×0.40 in)
- Weight: Approx 165g
- Operating system: Android 2.3.5 Gingerbread
- CPU: 1 GHz ARM Cortex A5
- Memory: 512 MB LPDDR1 SDRAM
- Storage: 4 GB
- Removable storage: up to 32 GB microSD
- Battery: 1630 mAh
- Rear camera: 5 megapixels, autofocus, dual-LED flash, Geo-tagging, touch focus, face detection
- Front camera: 0.3 megapixels
- Display: 4.3 inch, IPS WVGA, capacitive display, 480x800 pixels, 16M colors
- Sound: MP3/AAC/WMA/WAV
- Connectivity: Wi-Fi 802.11 b/g/n, Bluetooth with A2DP, micro USB
- Data inputs: multi touch
- Other: Wi-Fi hotspot
- Website: http://www.dialog.lk/personal/mobile/phones-and-accessories/dialog-i43/
- References: [1]

The Dialog i43 is a dual-SIM, slate-format smartphone designed and developed in China by Innos and marketed in Sri Lanka by Dialog Axiata. It operates on the Android platform, with the device initially launched running Android 2.3.5 Gingerbread. The Dialog i35 serves as the predecessor to this phone.

== Features ==
=== Services ===
The Dialog i43 uses Google's Android mobile operating system, which was introduced commercially in 2008. The i43 comes with Android version 2.3.5, named "Gingerbread", which became commercially available in July 2011. Gingerbread Enhanced copy/paste functionality, allowing users to select a word by press-hold, copy, and paste. It features new audio effects such as reverb, equalization, headphone virtualization, and bass boost. It includes a new download manager, giving users easy access to any file downloaded from the browser, email, or another application. It supports voice or video chat with Google Talk. A user can also make video calls using the front-facing camera.

=== Hardware and design ===
The Dialog i43 is 126.9 mm long, 69.5 mm wide, and 10.2mm thick, with the device weighing 165 grams. It contains a Qualcomm MSM8225 chipset, 1 GHz ARM Cortex-A5 CPU and 512 MB of LPDDR1 SDRAM. The device comes with 4 GB of internal storage, additionally it supports a microSD card up to 32 GB. This handset has a 4.3-inch, IPS WVGA capacitive display 480 x 800 pixels. It has a 5-megapixel rear camera with dual LED flash and a 0.3-megapixel front-facing camera supports for video callings. This phone has autofocus, touchfocus, geotagging and face detection. The Dialog i43's 1630 mAh battery has 360 hours standby time or 12 hours voice talk time. This device has a proximity sensor, a light sensor and an acceleration sensor.

=== Carrier ===
It is a dual SIM phone while one is a mini SIM, the other one is a micro SIM. The mini SIM slot is carrier locked as Dialog Axiata.
