= Association of Mobile Telecom Operators of Bangladesh =

Trade organisation

AMTOB
- Emblem of AMTOB
- Formation: 2009; 17 years ago
- Type: Registered, non-governmental society
- Headquarters: House – 74 (1st Floor), Gulshan Avenue; Dhaka-1212, Bangladesh
- Region served: Bangladesh
- President: Mahtab Uddin Ahmed
- Sr. Vice President: Eric Aas
- Vice President: Yasir Azman
- Website: www.amtob.org.bd

Association of Mobile Telecom Operators of Bangladesh (AMTOB), is a national trade organization representing all mobile telecom operators in Bangladesh. Mahtab Uddin Ahmed, MD and CEO of Robi Axiata is currently serving as President of AMTOB.

== History ==
AMTOB was founded in 2009 as a registered, non-governmental society for telecom operators and is located in Dhaka, Bangladesh. It represents the Bangladesh mobile industry in negotiations with relevant government agencies, regulators, financial institutions, civil society, technical bodies, media and other national & international organizations. It is the main trade body of mobile telecom industry in Bangladesh and represent Banglalink, Grameenphone, Citycell, Robi and TeleTalk.

== Members ==
The General Members of the body are:

- Banglalink
- Grameenphone
- Citycell
- Robi
- TeleTalk

The associate members of the body are:

- Ericsson
- Huawei
- Nokia
