= Milinda Moragoda =

Sri Lankan politician

The Honourable Asoka Milinda Moragoda
- අශෝක මිලින්ද මොරගොඩ
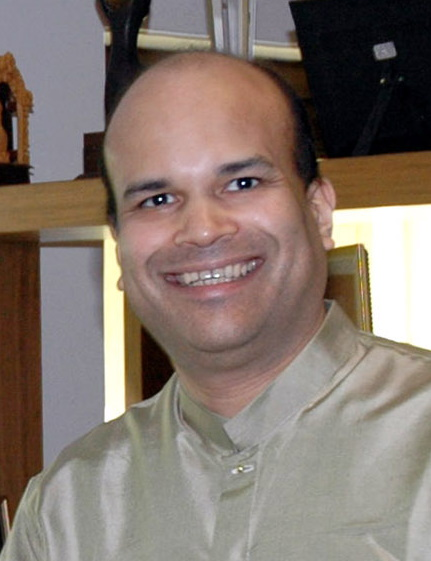
- Moragoda in 2009

High Commissioner of Sri Lanka to India
- In office August 2021–September 2023
- President: Gotabaya Rajapaksa; Ranil Wickremesinghe
- Preceded by: Austin Fernando
- Succeeded by: Kshenuka Senewiratne

Senior Adviser to the President
- In office 4 May 2011–9 January 2015
- President: Mahinda Rajapaksa

Minister of Justice and Law Reforms
- In office 2 July 2009 – 9 April 2010
- President: Mahinda Rajapaksa
- Prime Minister: Ratnasiri Wickremanayake
- Preceded by: Amarasiri Dodangoda
- Succeeded by: Athauda Seneviratne

Minister of Tourism
- In office 28 January 2007 – 2 July 2009
- President: Mahinda Rajapaksa
- Prime Minister: Ratnasiri Wickremanayake
- Deputy: Faiszer Musthapha
- Preceded by: Anura Bandaranaike

Minister of Economic Reform, Science and Technology
- In office 12 December 2001 – 2 April 2004; Non-Cabinet Minister until 28 February 2002
- President: Chandrika Kumaratunga
- Prime Minister: Ranil Wickremesinghe

Deputy Minister of Policy Development and Implementation
- In office 28 February 2002 – 11 February 2004
- President: Chandrika Kumaratunga
- Prime Minister: Ranil Wickremesinghe
- Minister: Ranil Wickremesinghe

Member of Parliament for Colombo District
- In office 5 December 2001 – 22 April 2010

Personal details
- Born: 4 June 1964 (age 62) Colombo, Sri Lanka
- Party: Sri Lanka Freedom Party (2011–present); United National Party (2000 − 2007)
- Other political affiliations: Sri Lanka National Congress (2009–2011); United People's Freedom Alliance (2007–present)
- Spouse: Jennifer Moragoda
- Relations: Moragodage Christopher Walter Pinto (father)
- Education: International Institute for Management Development; Royal College Colombo
- Website: www.milinda.org www.moragoda.org

Asoka Milinda Moragoda (Sinhala: අශෝක මිලින්ද මොරගොඩ, born 4 June 1964) is a Sri Lankan politician and businessman. He served as the High Commissioner of Sri Lanka to India with cabinet rank between 2021 and 2023. and, former Cabinet Minister and Member of Parliament representing the Colombo District from 2001 to 2010, who served as the Minister of Justice and Law Reform (2009–2010), Minister of Tourism (2007–2009); Minister for Economic Reform, Science and Technology and Deputy Minister for Plan Implementation and Development (2002–2004). His last political post was that of Opposition Leader of the Colombo Municipal Council and Senior Adviser to former President Mahinda Rajapakse.

In 2007 the Parliamentary Committee on Public Enterprises (COPE) accused then opposition parliamentarian Moragoda of large scale corruption during his time as a UNP minister. In a bid to dodge prosecution Moragoda crossed over to the ruling UPFA government and was appointed Minister of Justice and Law Reform.

== Early life and education ==
He was born to Moragodage Christopher Walter Pinto, a diplomat, and Yasodha Neiliya Jayawardena, daughter of U. N. Jayawardena the former Governor of the Central Bank of Ceylon. He attended Royal College Colombo and graduated with an MBA from the IMD in Lausanne Switzerland. Moragoda was a Fellow of the Weatherhead Centre for International Affairs (then known as the Centre for International Affairs) at Harvard University from 1994 to 1995.

== Business career ==
Before he entered politics, Moragoda was the Founder Chairman of Mercantile Merchant Bank Ltd (MMBL), an investment bank and private equity company in Sri Lanka. He was an alternate director on the founding board of the Colombo Stock Exchange.

== Political career ==
=== United National Party ===
During his political career of almost 10 years, Moragoda has worked in a number of key areas. He was a principal Government negotiators in the peace talks of 2002–2004. He was Minister of Economic Reform. He also gave leadership to the development and implementation of Sri Lanka’s ICT policy, E-Sri Lanka.

Moragoda was first entered to Parliament as a National List Member in 2000 with the United National Party (UNP) and was re-elected in 2001 and in 2004 from the Colombo District.

=== Sri Lanka Freedom Party ===
Upon crossing over the government Moragoda was appointed as the Minister of Tourism by President Mahinda Rajapaksa. During his tenure, he was able to successfully implement the Tourism Act of 2001. In July 2009 he was appointed as Minister of Justice and Law Reform. Even though he sat and voted with the government, he remained a member of the opposition UNP until 2010 when he started the Sri Lanka National Congress (SLNC). The SLNC was disbanded in 2011 when Milinda joined the Sri Lanka Freedom Party, the main party of UPFA led by President Mahinda Rajapaksa. In the 2010 general election he lost his parliamentary seat.

In 2011 he became the UPFA's mayoral candidate in the October 2011 municipal election in Colombo. He was elected to Colombo Municipal Council, becoming its opposition leader.

== Allegations of Corruption ==
In 2007 Moragoda's party was in the opposition having lost the 2005 elections to the UPFA. As the UPFA Government sought to expose corruption during the UNP regime the Parliamentary Committee on Public Enterprises (COPE) released a report accusing Moragoda of widespread corruption and abuse of power.

Mercantile Credit Ltd, a subsidiary of Mercantile Merchant Bank, founded by Moragoda was found to defaulted on loans of 4.7 Billion Rupees (which had been obtained by providing false information) while Moragoda was Minister for Economic Reform. COPE conducted three inquiries into these loans and their defaulting but on each occasion the investigations were never allowed to reach the final stages due to political pressure.

In 2002 Lanka Marine Service (Pvt) Limited owned by state-owned Ceylon Petroleum Corporation which sat on an 8.5-acre plot in the Colombo harbour was sold to the Sri Lankan conglomerate John Keells Holdings. The Supreme Court ruled that as then PERC chairman, Dr. P.B. Jayasundara and Executive Director of JKH Susantha Ratnayake had acted with dishonest intent in the sale of LMSL shares. The Bribery Commission also began investigations into criminal charges against Dr. Jayasundara, former Ministers Milinda Moragoda (PERC was under him) and Karu Jayasuriya (CPC was under him) on the charge of abusing public property in connection with this deal.

Before the investigation could reach conclude both Moragoda and Jayasriya crossed over to the government. Reporting on the privatisation of Lanka Marine Service COPE stated that by his actions Moragoda had at the very least incurred a loss of 1.7 Bn rupees for the government.

The COPE report also alleged severe irregularities in the privatisation of Sri Lanka Insurance which happened under the tenure of Moragoda. The report stated that Moragoda created a loss of over 3 Bn Rupees for the government solely through non-compliance with the 4th term of the contract. These investigations too were not concluded before Moragoda crossed over to the government.

== Links to the USA ==
Leaked US Embassy cables show Moragoda to be a long time information source of the US Embassy in Colombo. The cables also state the US Government's interest in Moragoda as their key partner in Sri Lanka. Writing to Washington in 2003, then US Ambassador to Sri Lanka Ashley Wills says of Moragoda:

[Regarding] the U.S., the intelligent, articulate Moragoda is a perfect fit. born in Washington, D.C, he is a dual national Amcit (please protect) married to an American, with plenty of Washington connections, many from his days as a visiting fellow at the Heritage Foundation and at Harvard. A "big picture" person, Moragoda is also highly aware that the U.S. is the most powerful country in the world, and he feels that it is better that Sri Lanka recognize that fact and work within it.

== Other work ==
Moragoda has served as a member of the Commission on Legal Empowerment of the Poor, which was co-chaired by Madeleine Albright and Hernando de Soto.

He has founded a number of non-profit organisations. Among them is the Milinda Moragoda Institute for People's Empowerment, under whose aegis operates a humanitarian de-mining programme in the North and East which has been in operation since 2002 and Apeksha, a free English Education Programme for children of low income families.

== Honors ==
- Order of Rio Branco conferred by the Government of Brazil for services he rendered to Brazil as Honorary Consul for Brazil (1990–2004)
- In 1999 the World Economic Forum, based in Geneva, nominated Milinda to serve as a Global Leader of Tomorrow (2000-2005). They again selected him to serve as a member of the newly created group of Young Global Leaders in 2005.

== See also ==
- Ministry of Justice and Law Reforms
