= Etisalat (Sri Lanka) =

Telecoms company in Sri Lanka

Etisalat Lanka (Pvt) Ltd
- Native name: එටිසලාට් ලංකා (ප්‍රයිවට්) ලිමිටඩ්, எடிசலாட் லங்கா (பிரைவட்) லிமிடெட்
- Formerly: Celltel; Tigo
- Type: Private Company
- Industry: Telecommunications
- Predecessors: Tigo (2006–2007); Celltel Lanka (1989–2006)
- Founded: 1989 in Colombo, Sri Lanka (as Celltel Lanka (Pvt) Ltd)
- Defunct: 30 November 2018; 7 years ago
- Fate: Merged with Hutch
- Successors: Hutch
- Headquarters: Colombo 03, Sri Lanka
- Key people: Sulaiman Salim Alkaabi (CEO)
- Products: Mobile Telecommunications, Mobile Broadband
- Owner: Emirates Telecommunications Group Company PJSC
- Website: web.archive.org/web/20190331070532/http://www.etisalat.lk/

Etisalat (Sinhalese: එටිසලාට් Etisalat; Tamil: எடிசலாட்) (formerly known as Celltel and later Tigo), was a mobile telecommunications network in Sri Lanka. It was owned by the UAE based telecommunications operator Etisalat until December 2018. Etisalat had over 4.2 million customers at the end of February 2012. The company announced the commercial launch of Dual Carrier HSPA+ services on 15 August 2012, becoming the first operator in South Asia to do so. In April 2018 CK Hutchison Group and Etisalat Group have entered into a definitive agreement to merge their mobile telecommunications businesses in Sri Lanka. Upon completion of the transaction, CKHH Group will have the majority and controlling stake in the combined entity. CK Hutchison completed the acquisition of Etisalat Lanka on 30 November 2018.

== History ==
=== Celltel and Tigo ===
The old Tigo logo present between 2007–2010

Celltel was founded on 18 June 1989 on a Motorola TACS system, becoming the first cellular network in Sri Lanka and 36th operator in world. It was then re-branded by Millicom International in January 2007, as Tigo (Sri Lanka). then it was acquired by Etisalat.

=== Acquisition by Etisalat ===
Etisalat acquired Sri Lankan operations of Millicom International (Tigo Sri Lanka). The acquisition was completed with a total enterprise value of 207 Million US$, out of which 155 Million US$ was in cash. Etisalat changed the Operator/Brand Name Tigo to Etisalat on 25 February 2010.

=== Acquisition by Hutch ===
In April 2018 CK Hutchison Holdings and Etisalat Group have entered into a definitive agreement to merge their mobile telecommunications businesses in Sri Lanka. Upon completion of the transaction, CKHH Group will have the majority and controlling stake in the combined entity. CK Hutchison completed the acquisition of Etisalat Lanka on 30 November 2018.

== Competition ==
Before the acquisition by Hutch, the operator competed with other mobile operators Dialog Axiata, Mobitel, Hutch and Airtel.

== Technology ==
Etisalat Lanka operated a GSM/EDGE supported network using 900 / 1800 MHz. The company on 5 May 2011 launched HSPA+ services over 2100 MHz, becoming a LTE ready mobile network in the country. The company announced the commercial launch of DC-HSPA+ service on 15 August 2012, was the first operator in the South Asian region and the 63rd in the world to do so.

== Slogan ==
The slogan of the company was "power to you".
