= Ministry of Economic Development (Sri Lanka) =

Government ministry of Sri Lanka

Ministry overview
- Formed: 2010
- Dissolved: 2015
- Superseding Ministry: Ministry of National Policies and Economic Affairs
- Jurisdiction: Democratic Socialist Republic of Sri Lanka

The Ministry of Economic Development was a former ministry of the Government of Sri Lanka, and was a member ministry of the cabinet of Sri Lanka. It was briefly merged with several other ministries and renamed the Ministry of Policy Planning, Economics Affairs, Child, Youth and Cultural Affairs from January 2015 onwards, before being replaced by the Ministry of National Policies and Economic Affairs in August 2015.

== Ministers ==
Minister of Economic Development
- Appointer: The president on advice of the prime minister
- Formation: 23 April 2010
- First holder: Basil Rajapaksa
- Final holder: Harsha de Silva
- Succession: Minister of National Policies and Economic Affairs

Parties

Sri Lanka Freedom Party United National Party

Name	Portrait	Party	Tenure	President	Ministerial title
Basil Rajapaksa	Basil Rajapaksa	Sri Lanka Freedom Party	23 April 2010 – 9 January 2015	Mahinda Rajapaksa	Minister of Economic Development
Ranil Wickremesinghe	Ranil Wickremesinghe	United National Party	12 January 2015 – 17 August 2015	Maithripala Sirisena	Minister of Policy Planning, Economics Affairs, Child, Youth and Cultural Affairs
Ranil Wickremesinghe	Ranil Wickremesinghe	United National Party	1 September 2015 – 26 October 2018	Maithripala Sirisena	Minister of National Policies and Economic Affairs
Harsha de Silva		United National Party	21 December 2018 –	Maithripala Sirisena	Minister of Economic Reforms and Public Distribution
