= Senior Adviser to the President of Sri Lanka =

Chief/Senior Adviser
- Incumbent; Hans Wijayasuriya
- Presidential Secretariat
- Website: Official website

Chief/Senior Adviser to the President is a title used by the highest-ranking advisers to the President of Sri Lanka. Chief/Senior Presidential Advisers are attached to but are not part of the Presidential Secretariat. The title has been used formally since 1990's to differentiate from other Presidential Advisers and Coordinating Secretaries. Since 2024, the title of Chief Adviser to the President has been used.

== Responsibilities ==
Over time, Senior Advisers have been appointed to advise the president on following areas:

- Political Affairs
- International Affairs
- Economic Affairs
- Legal and Constitutional Affairs
- National Security

Currently, Chief Advisers have been appointed for:

- Digital Economy

== Remuneration ==
As of 2015, a Presidential Adviser were paid a salary of Rs 75,000 which was supplemented by an allowance of one third of their salary. In addition, an adviser is issued with a mobile phone, a laptop and a fully maintained vehicle as well as 200 liters of fuel which was increased based on their outstation travel. While mobile and residential phone bills are partially paid by the Presidential Secretariat.

== Present Chief/Senior Advisers to the President ==
- Hans Wijayasuriya - Chief Adviser on Digital Economy

== Notable Senior Advisers to the President ==
- D. M. Jayaratne
- Ratnasiri Wickremanayake
- Milinda Moragoda
- K. Balapatabendi
- Bradman Weerakoon
- Ravi Jayewardene
- Harry Jayawardena
- Lalith Weerathunga

== See also ==
- Presidential Adviser
- Senior Advisor to the President of the United States
- Special adviser (UK)
- Senior Advisor
