= Presidential Advisor =

- Presidential Secretariat
- Website: Official website

Presidential Advisor is a title used by advisors to the President of Sri Lanka. Presidential Advisors are attached to but are not part of the Presidential Secretariat. The title has been used formally since 1990's to differentiate from more senior Senior Advisors to the President and Coordinating Secretaries.

== Notable presidential advisors ==
- Gamini Iriyagolla
- Austin Fernando
- Dr Chris Nonis

== See also ==
- Senior Adviser to the President of Sri Lanka
- Special adviser (UK)
