= Hans Wijayasuriya =

Sri Lankan businessman

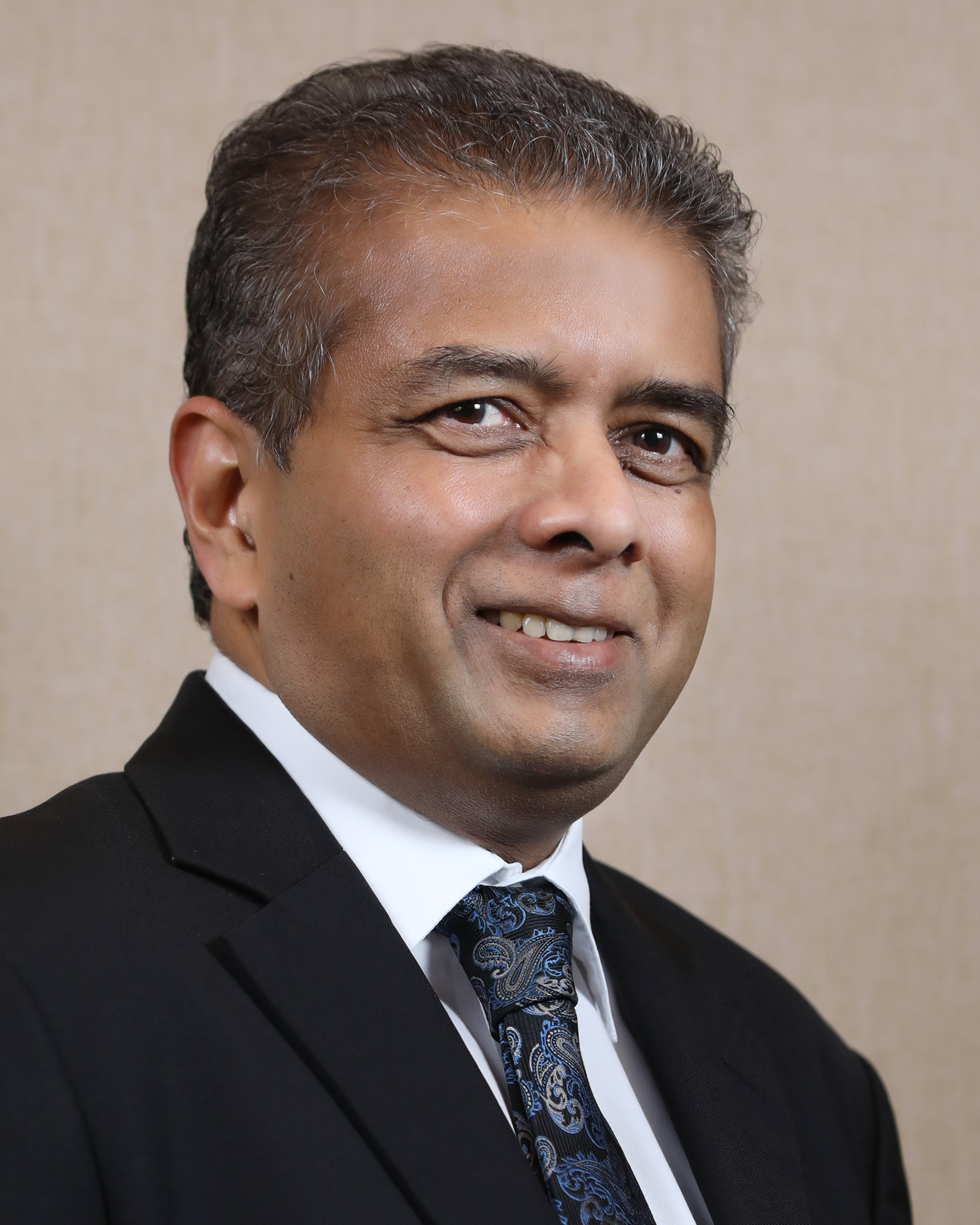
- Born: April 2, 1968 (age 58); Colombo, Sri Lanka
- Education: University of Cambridge; University of Bristol, S. Thomas' College, Mt. Lavinia
- Occupations: Group Executive Vice President & Chief Executive Officer – Telecommunications Business Axiata Group Berhad
- Known for: Dialog Axiata PLC

Sridir Sariputta Hansa "Hans" Wijayasuriya (born April 2, 1968), a Sri Lanka born Global Telecommunications Executive, is the Group Executive Director and CEO Telecommunications Business of the Axiata Group Berha., Asia’s second-largest telecommunications company. Until 2016, he was also the Group Chief Executive of Dialog Axiata PLC, Sri Lanka’s largest mobile communications provider. During the period 2012-14, He was founder CEO of Axiata Digital Services, the pan-region Digital Services arm of the Axiata Group.

In March 2024, the GSM Association (the trade group for the mobile industry), honored him with the Chairman's Award for outstanding contribution to the global mobile industry which is the most prestigious recognition granted by the GSMA. Hans was also named "Sri Lankan of the Year" in 2008, by a local business journal, LMD.

== Early life and education ==
Born to P. M. W. Wijayasuriya, a former auditor general of Sri Lanka and Susila Wijayasuriya, a painter, Hans was educated at S. Thomas' College, Mount Lavinia, Sri Lanka. He graduated from the University of Cambridge in 1989 with a degree in electrical and electronic engineering. He later obtained his PhD in Digital Mobile Communications from the University of Bristol in 1994. A Chartered Engineer and Fellow of the Institution of Engineering Technology UK, Wijayasuriya also holds an MBA from the University of Warwick UK.

== Corporate career ==
Wijayasuriya joined Dialog Axiata, the fourth entrant to Sri Lanka’s mobile market as a member of the founding management team in 1994. He became chief executive in 1997. Dialog is today one of Asia’s most advanced Quad Play connectivity and Digital Services providers. Hans went on to become the CEO for South Asia of the Axiata Group in 2016, and in 2020 was named Group Executive Vice President & CEO for Telecommunications Business responsible for the Telecommunications Businesses of the Axiata Group across the markets of Malaysia, Indonesia, Cambodia, Sri Lanka, and Bangladesh. In March 2023, Hans was appointed to the Board of Directors of Axiata Group, in the capacity of an Executive Director. Hans serves as a director of several Axiata Group Companies in the region.

In March 2024, the GSM Association (the trade group for the mobile industry), honored him with the Chairman's Award for outstanding contribution to the global mobile industry which is the most prestigious recognition granted by the GSMA. Hans is a member of the Board of Directors of the GSM Association. Hans is a past Chairman of GSM Asia-Pacific – the Regional interest group of the GSM Association. In 2016, the GSM Association named Hans as the first recipient of the “Outstanding Contribution to the Asian Mobile Industry” Award.

Wijayasuriya is a past chairman of the Ceylon Chamber of Commerce and a member of the board of directors of John Keells Holdings PLC. He is also a past chairman of the Arthur C. Clarke Institute for Modern Technologies, Hans has also served on the Boards of the Information and Communication Technology Agency (ICTA) of Sri Lanka and the Sri Lanka Institute of Information Technology (SLIIT).

Hans has published on the subject of digital mobile communications (S.S.H Wijayasuriya et al.), including research papers in publications of the Institute of Electrical and Electronics Engineers (IEEE) USA, Royal Society and the Institute of Electrical Engineers (IEE) UK. He has also presented papers at several International conferences on digital mobile communications.

== Public service ==
Wijayasuriya was appointed on 1 November 2024 as the Chief Advisor to the President on Digital Economy by Anura Kumara Dissanayake with the task of leading the Sri Lankan government's digital transformation initiatives.
