= Hutch (Sri Lanka) =

Sri Lankan mobile operator

Hutchison Telecommunications Lanka (Pvt) Ltd
- Trade name: Hutch
- Native name: හචිසන් ටෙලිකොමියුනිකේෂන්ස් ලංකා (ප්‍රයිවට්) ලිමිටඩ් ஹட்சிஷன் டெலிகொமினிகேஷன் லங்கா (பிரைவட்) லிமிடட்
- Type: Private
- Industry: Telecommunications
- Predecessors: Etisalat (2010-2018); Tigo (2006-2010); Celltel (1989-2006); CallLink
- Founded: 2004; 22 years ago
- Headquarters: Colombo, Sri Lanka
- Key people: Saumitra Gupta (CEO)
- Products: Mobile Telephony
- Parent: Hutchison Asia Telecom Group
- Website: www.hutch.lk

Hutchison Telecommunications Lanka (Pvt) Ltd, d.b.a. Hutch (Sinhala: හච්, Tamil: ஹட்ச்) is a Sri Lankan telecommunication service provider and the country's third largest mobile network operator, with approximately 4 million subscribers as of December 2025.

Hutch is a subsidiary of CK Hutchison Holdings Limited, which owns an 90.36% stake in the company. The rest is held by Emirates Telecommunication Group Company PJSC. Initially it was called CallLink and was the second mobile operator in Sri Lanka. Hutchison acquired its services in 1998 with the aim of becoming a nationwide operator in Sri Lanka. As of September 2018, Hutch had network coverage of approximately 90% of the island. Hutch announced that they acquired Etisalat on 30 November 2018.

Hutchison Telecom Lanka is a member of Hutchison Asia Telecom which offers mobile telecommunications operations in Indonesia, Vietnam, and Sri Lanka. Hutchison Asia Telecom is a part of CK Hutchison Holdings which includes the 3 Group comprising 3G operations in Austria, Denmark, Hong Kong, Indonesia, Ireland, Italy, Macau, Sweden. and the UK.

== Competition ==
Hutch Sri Lanka competes with operators Dialog and SLTMobitel.

== Technology ==
Hutch Sri Lanka operates a GSM/EDGE/HSPA+/4G supported network using 900 / 1800 MHz. In 2012 the company launched HSPA+ services using 2100 MHz. The company launched 4G via 1800 MHz B3 in 2018 and 900 MHz B8 in 2019. Hutch demonstrated 5G in Sri Lanka on 17 March 2021 with the cooperation of ZTE technologies.
