= Citycell =

Telecommunications network company

Pacific Bangladesh Telecom Limited
- Type: Private Limited
- Industry: Telecommunications
- Founded: 1989
- Defunct: 20 October 2016
- Fate: Bankrupt
- Headquarters: 8th Floor Pacific Center, 14, Mohakhali C/A, Dhaka, Bangladesh
- Area served: Bangladesh
- Key people: Mehboob Chowdhury (CEO); David Lee (COO)
- Products: Telephony, Mobile Broadband, CDMA, EVDO, SMS
- Brands: Citycell, Zoom Ultra
- Revenue: $32 million (2012)
- Parent: Pacific Motors Limited (37.95%); Far East Telecom Limited (17.51%); SingTel Asia Pacific Investments Pte Ltd. (44.54%)
- Website: citycell.com

Pacific Bangladesh Telecom Limited, (dba: Citycell) was the oldest mobile operator of Bangladesh. It was the 1st mobile operator company in Bangladesh and one of the pioneering telecommunications network companies in South Asia, along with Etisalat of Sri Lanka and Paktel of Pakistan. Former BNP leader & former foreign minister M Morshed Khan is the founder chairman of PBTL (Pacific Bangladesh Telecom Limited) & Citycell. It was the only mobile operator in the country using CDMA and EVDO technology. Citycell's total mobile subscriber base was 0.142 million as of August 2016. The ownership structure of Citycell was divided amongst SingTel (44.54%), Pacific Motors (37.95%) and Far East Telecom (17.51%). It was the smallest mobile operator of Bangladesh in terms of subscribers. In 2016, it ceased operations, due to the firms inability to pay dues ordered by the BTRC in 2016.

== History ==
Previous Citycell logo.

In 1989 Bangladesh Telecom Limited (BTL) was awarded a license to operate cellular, paging, and other wireless communication networks. Then in 1990 Hutchison Bangladesh Telecom Limited (HBTL) was incorporated in Bangladesh as a joint venture between BTL and Hutchison Telecommunications (Bangladesh) Limited. HBTL began commercial operation in Dhaka using the AMPS mobile technology in 1993 and became the 2nd cellular operator in South Asia (after Sri Lanka's Celltell, established on 1989). Later that year Pacific Motors bought 50% of BTL. By in 1995 HBTL was renamed as Pacific Bangladesh Telecom Limited (PBTL) and launched the brand name 'Citycell Digital' to market its cellular products.

By the end of 2007 Citycell had refurbished its old brand identity and introduced a new logo and corporate identity; the new logo is very reminiscent of the old logo. However, the slogan "because we care" has remained unchanged.

On 20 October 2016, the Bangladesh Telecommunication Regulatory Commission suspended the spectrum allocation of Citycell after evaluation of the company's number of dues. But on 3 November 2016, the Supreme Court of Bangladesh directed the BTRC to reinstate its spectrum and on 6 November 2016, BTRC returned the suspended spectrum to Citycell.

== Products offered ==
Citycell used to offer both prepaid and postpaid plans. Since Citycell operated in CDMA technology, it offered R-UIMs instead of SIMs.

=== Prepaid ===
Citycell previously offered nine different prepaid plans. Citycell started offering prepaid plans from 2003. It was the first to offer a prepaid plan with BTTB connectivity in the same year. In 2005, it launched the Aalap Call Me plan - the first phone plan with negative tariff in the country. In the plan, customers received credit towards their balance after they received calls from other Citycell subscribers. In the same year, Citycell launched Aalap Super plan. Subscribers of this plan could make free calls to other Citycell subscribers during late night hours. This espoused numerous copycat products from its competitors. Later that year the regulator, BTRC, ordered all phone companies to cease free call facility offerings. In 2006, Citycell launched Hello 0123 plan. The name 0123 signified tariff of Tk 0 for calls to one Citycell number of the subscriber's choice, Tk 1 for calls to two other Citycell numbers, Tk 2 for calls to all other Citycell numbers and Tk 3 for calls to all other networks. This plan was followed up with a string of other spinoff plans that continued into 2007.

=== Postpaid ===
The postpaid plan was branded as Citycell One. The Postpaid subscribers enjoy 4 FnF numbers to other operators, 30 sec pulse applicable for all outgoing, Data service etc. in additional. Besides, two newly launched postpaid plans are available.

In Dhaka International Trade fair 2009, Citycell Introduced a postpaid service called VOICE-DATA plan with cheaper tariff voice call and sms on any operator and BTTB (NWD) and 0.25 Tk/minute voice call and sms on any Citycell Number.

=== Zoom Ultra ===
Zoom Ultra is a data plan where the customer receives an internet dongle to surf the web in the regions which Citycell provides coverage. Zoom came with either one of two MODEMs, Huawei EC321 or ZTE MG880+. Zoom Ultra utilizes EV-DO technology. ZTE AC782 or Tianjian E618 is the dongle given with Zoom Ultra. Huawei EC5321 router is also offered for Zoom Ultra service. Zoom Ultra provides download speeds up to 512 kbit/s.

== Criticism and penalty ==
Citycell has been fined BDT 1.5 billion (150 crore) by the Bangladesh Telecommunication Regulatory Commission for its involvement in illegal VoIP or international call termination.

Citycell's involvement in illegal VoIP, was discovered in May 2007 during a raid in the company's Mohakhali office by the BTRC.

In 2023, the government cancelled 2G license of CityCell.
