= Ministry of National Policies and Economic Affairs =

Government ministry of Sri Lanka

- ජාතික ප්‍රතිපත්ති හා ආර්ථික කටයුතු අමාත්‍යාංශය தேசிய கொள்கைகள் மற்றும் பொருளாதார அலுவல்கள் அமைச்சு

Agency overview
- Preceding agency: Ministry of Economic Development
- Jurisdiction: Democratic Socialist Republic of Sri Lanka
- Headquarters: Floor 1, Miloda, Bristol street, Colombo 1; 6.936136°N 79.845960°E
- Minister responsible: Vacant
- Deputy Ministers responsible: Vacant; Vacant
- Agency executives: M.I.M. Rafeek, Ministry Secretary; Shantha Bandara, Secretary to the State Minister
- Child agencies: Central Bank of Sri Lanka; Credit Information Bureau; Department of Census & Statistics; Department of External Resources; Department of National Planning; Institute of Policy Studies; National Centre for Leadership Development; National Human Resources Development Council; National Insurance Trust Fund; National Pay Commission; National Youth Services Co-operative Limited; National Youth Corps; National Youth Services Council; Public Utilities Commission of Sri Lanka; Securities & Exchange Commission; Small Enterprises Development Bureau; Youth Services (Pvt.) Ltd.
- Website: mnpea.gov.lk

The Ministry of National Policies and Economic Affairs (Sinhala: ජාතික ප්‍රතිපත්ති හා ආර්ථික කටයුතු අමාත්‍යාංශය Jāthika Prathipaththi hā Ārthika Katayuthu Amathyanshaya; Tamil: தேசிய கொள்கைகள் மற்றும் பொருளாதார அலுவல்கள் அமைச்சு) is a cabinet ministry of the Government of Sri Lanka responsible for formulation of national economic-, national development and monetary policies and strategies, and for coordinating with international agencies and mobilizing foreign resources for the country's economic development.

== List of ministers ==
Minister of National Policies and Economic Affairs
- Incumbent; Vacant since 21 November 2019
- Nominator: Prime Minister of Sri Lanka
- Appointer: President of Sri Lanka
- Inaugural holder: Ranil Wickremesinghe
- Formation: 4 September 2015
- Website: www.mnpea.gov.lk

Parties

Sri Lanka Freedom Party United National Party

| Name | Portrait | Party | Tenure | Government |
|---|---|---|---|---|
| Ranil Wickremesinghe | Ranil Wickremesinghe | United National Party | 4 September 2015 – 21 November 2019 | Sirisena |

== See also ==
- Banking in Sri Lanka
- Economy of Sri Lanka
- Ministry of Finance (Sri Lanka)
- Sri Lankan rupee
