= Dialog K35 =

- Brand: Dialog Axiata
- Manufacturer: innos
- Type: Touchscreen smartphone
- Series: Dialog K series
- Availability by region: Sri Lanka
- Successor: Dialog K45
- Related: Dialog i35 Dialog i43
- Compatible networks: 2G (850/900/1800/1900 MHz) 3G (WCDMA 2100 MHz)
- Form factor: Slate
- Operating system: Android 4.0.4 Ice Cream Sandwich
- CPU: 1 GHz Broadcom 21654 processor
- Memory: 512 MB RAM
- Storage: 4 GB
- Removable storage: Micro SD (up to 32 GB)
- Rear camera: 3.2 megapixles, Autofocus, dual-LED flash, Geo-tagging, touch focus, face detection
- Front camera: 0.3 megapixels
- Display: 3.5 inch IPS QHD Capacitive display 320×480 pixels 265K colors
- Sound: MP3/AAC/WMA/WAV
- Connectivity: Wifi 802.11 b/g/n, Bluetooth with A2DP, micro USB
- Data inputs: Multi-touch capacitive touchscreen
- Other: Wi-Fi hotspot
- Website: http://www.dialog.lk/personal/mobile/phones-and-accessories/dialog-k35/

The Dialog K35 is a dual-SIM slate smartphone operating on the Android platform, originally designed and developed by Innos in China and subsequently marketed by Dialog Axiata in Sri Lanka. Equipped with a 1 GHz Broadcom CPU and 512 MB of RAM, the device delivers reliable performance. Its 3.5-inch IPS QHD capacitive display, boasting a resolution of 320×480 pixels, enhances user experience.

With 4 GB of internal storage and expandable support for microSD cards up to 32 GB, the Dialog K35 offers ample space for multimedia content. The smartphone is compatible with GPRS, EDGE, and 3G networks, ensuring versatile connectivity options for users. This device caters to a diverse range of user needs with its compact design, efficient processing capabilities, and connectivity features.
