= Dialog K45 =

- Brand: Dialog Axiata
- Manufacturer: innos
- Type: Touchscreen smartphone
- Series: Dialog K series
- Availability by region: Sri Lanka
- Predecessor: Dialog K35
- Related: Dialog i35 Dialog i43
- Compatible networks: 2G (850/900/1800/1900 MHz) 3G (WCDMA 2100 MHz)
- Form factor: Slate
- Dimensions: 131.1×66.9×9 mm (5.16×2.63×0.35 in)
- Operating system: Android 4.0.4 Ice Cream Sandwich
- CPU: 1.2GHz Dual-core ARM Cortex-A5
- Memory: 768 MB LPDDR1 SD-RAM
- Storage: 4 GB
- Removable storage: up to 32 GB micro SD
- Battery: 1800 mAh
- Rear camera: 8 megapixles, Autofocus, dual-LED flash, Geo-tagging, touch focus, face detection
- Front camera: 2 megapixels
- Display: 4.5 inch, IPS QHD Capacitive display 540x960 pixels 16.7M colors
- Sound: MP3/AAC/WMA/WAV
- Connectivity: Wifi 802.11 b/g/n, Bluetooth with A2DP, micro USB
- Data inputs: Multi-touch capacitive touchscreen
- Other: Wi-Fi hotspot
- Website: http://www.dialog.lk/personal/mobile/phones-and-accessories/dialog-k45/
- References: [1]

The Dialog K45 is a dual-SIM slate format smartphone. It was designed and developed in China by Innos and marketed in Sri Lanka by Dialog Axiata and runs on the Android operating system. It has a 1.2 GHz ARM Cortex-A5 CPU with 768 MB LPDDR1 SD-RAM. The handset has a 540x960 pixels 4.5-inch IPS QHD Capacitive display. It has 4 GB of internal storage. Compatible networks for this device are GPRS, EDGE, and 3G. It has Wi-Fi, Bluetooth, and USB connectivity. The device was launched with an Android 4.0.4 Ice Cream Sandwich.
