= Airtel Sri Lanka =

Sri Lankan subsidiary of Airtel, providing telecommunications services

Bharti Airtel Lanka
- Type: Subsidiary
- Industry: Telecommunications
- Founded: January 12, 2009; 17 years ago
- Fate: Merged with Dialog Axiata
- Successor: Dialog Axiata
- Headquarters: Colombo, Sri Lanka
- Area served: Sri Lanka
- Products: Mobile telephony; Broadband
- Parent: Dialog Axiata
- Website: www.airtel.lk

Airtel (Sinhala: එයාටෙල්, romanized: Eyāṭel, Tamil: எயார்டெல்) was the brand name of former mobile network operator, Bharti Airtel Lanka (Pvt) Ltd. It was started as the Sri Lankan subsidiary of Indian multinational telecommunications company Bharti Airtel.

The company was awarded a mobile phone operator license in 2006 and was scheduled to start operations in early 2007, however, the company didn't commence services until 12 January 2009, with approximately 3 million subscribers of the Sri Lankan mobile market as of June 2024.

On 27th June 2024, Dialog Axiata acquired 100% of Airtel Lanka.

== Network data ==
- MNC: 413 05
- Operator code: 075

== History ==
Bharti Airtel Lanka (Pvt) Ltd is a subsidiary of Bharti Airtel Limited, the second largest mobile operator in the world, with over 480 million mobile customers as of September 2020. Bharti Airtel has been featured in Forbes Asia's Fab 50 list, rated amongst the best-performing companies in the world in the BusinessWeek IT 100 list 2007, and voted as India's most innovative company in a survey by The Wall Street Journal.

Airtel Sri Lanka commenced commercial operations of services on 13 January 2009. Granted a license in 2007 in accordance with the Sri Lanka Telecommunications Act No. 25 of 1991, it is also a registered company under the Board of Investment Sri Lanka. Under the license, the company provides digital mobile services to Sri Lanka. This is inclusive of voice telephony, voice mail, data services and GSM-based services. All of these services are provided under the airtel brand.

Airtel received the 2nd Place award in the 16th National Business Excellence Awards (NBEA) in 2019. Airtel Sri Lanka has 3G island wide coverage. On November Telecommunications Regulatory Commission of Sri Lanka (TRCSL) approved airtel high speed 4G 850 MHz band operate for indoor coverage.

== Network implementation ==
Airtel currently uses 2G/ 4G LTE and VoLTE. and currently under testing 5G Capabilities. The Telecommunications Regulatory Commission of Sri Lanka (TRCSL) had granted its permission to Bharti Airtel Lanka (Pvt) Ltd (Airtel) to shut down their 3G mobile network by June 24, 2022

== Airtel 4G LTE broadband and coverage ==
Airtel invested $20 million in 2014 to improve their island-wide 3G Coverage.

Airtel has been significantly investing in its 4G infrastructure during the past few years. By November 2021, the telco added over 2,000 sites along with 400 additional towers commissioned across the country following its 4G launch. The push from the company was a result of the sharp uptick in data usage following the pandemic.

Airtel 4G operates on 850 MHz and 2100 MHz frequency bands, with the 2500 MHz band used in high-density areas. According to the company, these frequency bands provides broader network availability and improved indoor coverage.
