= Stub Series Terminated Logic =

Electrical standards

Stub Series Terminated Logic (SSTL) is a group of electrical standards for driving transmission lines commonly used with DRAM based DDR memory IC's and memory modules. SSTL is primarily designed for driving the DDR (double-data-rate) SDRAM modules used in computer memory; however, it is also used in other applications, notably some PCI Express PHYs and other high-speed devices.

Four voltage levels for SSTL are defined:

- SSTL_3, 3.3 V, defined in EIA/JESD8-8 1996
- SSTL_2, 2.5 V, defined in EIA/JESD8-9B 2002 used in DDR among other things.
- SSTL_18, 1.8 V, defined in EIA/JESD8-15A, used in DDR2 among other things.
- SSTL_15, 1.5 V, used in DDR3 among other things.

SSTL_3 uses a reference of 0.45 * VDDQ (1.5 V). SSTL_2 and SSTL_18 reference a voltage that is exactly VDDQ / 2 (1.25 V and 0.9 V respectively).

SSTL_3 and SSTL_2 support two termination classes (50 ohm or 25 ohm load). SSTL_18 only supports one (25 ohm load).

== See also ==
- High-Speed Transceiver Logic - HSTL
