= Dialog Axiata =

Sri Lankan telecommunications company

Dialog Axiata PLC
- Native name: ඩයලොග් ආසිආටා පි.එල්.සි; டயலொக் ஆசியாடா பிஎல்சி
- Type: Public Subsidiary
- Traded as: CSE: DIAL.N0000
- ISIN: LK0348N00009
- Industry: Telecommunications
- Predecessors: MTN Networks (Pvt.) Ltd. (1993–2005); Dialog Telekom PLC (2005–2010)
- Founded: 27 August 1993; 33 years ago
- Headquarters: Colombo, Sri Lanka
- Key people: David Nai Pek Lau (chairman); Supun Weerasinghe (Group Chief Executive)
- Products: Fixed & Mobile Telephone; Fixed & Wireless Broadband; Satellite TV; Finance
- Revenue: ▲LKR179.6 billion (2025)
- Operating income: ▲LKR 38.6 billion (2025)
- Net income: ▲LKR 20.7 billion (2025)
- Total assets: ▲LKR 275.4 billion (2025)
- Total equity: ▲LKR 90.1 billion (2025)
- Owners: Axiata Investments (Labuan) Limited (73.75%); Bharti Airtel Limited (10.36%)
- Number of employees: 2,865 (2025)
- Parent: Axiata Group Berhad
- Subsidiaries: Dialog Broadband Networks (Pvt) Ltd; Dialog Television (Pvt) Ltd; Digital Holdings Lanka (Pvt) Ltd; Dialog Device Trading (Pvt) Ltd; Dialog Business Services (Pvt) Ltd; Dialog Finance PLC; Dialog Network Services (Pvt) Ltd; Firstsource-Dialog Solutions (Pvt) Ltd
- Website: www.dialog.lk

Dialog Axiata PLC (Sinhala: ඩයලොග් ආසිආටා පීඑල්සී, romanized: Dayalog Âsiâtâ PîElSî, Tamil: டயலொக் ஆசியாடா பிஎல்சி) (formerly known as MTN Networks and later Dialog Telekom) is the largest telecommunications service provider In Sri Lanka with around 19.6 million mobile subscribers which amount to nearly 67% of the mobile market share.Dialog is a subsidiary of Axiata Group Berhad which owns 73.75% controlling stake of the company, while Bharti Airtel owns 10.355%

Dialog was Listed on the Colombo Stock Exchange in June 2005. As of May 2026 Dialog Axiata holds LKR 345 billion (US$1.05 billion) in market capitalization and among the top 5 largest listed company in Sri Lanka by Market Capitalization. In 2025 "Dialog" brand name was valued at LKR 35.4 billion (US$108 million) and as the 3rd most valuable brand in the country by business magazine LMD in its annual study.In 2014 the company received the highest "Platinum" rating in the country's Corporate Accountability Index for the 4th consecutive year.

Dialog operates on 2G, 4G LTE, 5G NSA communications networks, and became the first operator to launch commercial 3G and HSPA+ operations in Southern Asia when it rollout the network on 16 August 2006. In April 2013 Dialog Axiata launched its mobile 4G LTE services using 10 Mhz of spectrum in 1800 Mhz band becoming the first operator to launch commercial FD-LTE network in South Asia, initially delivering peak data rates of 100 Mbit/s. Dialog Axiata was also the first to introduce the 5G network in Sri Lanka.

In addition to its core business of mobile telephony, the company operates a number of services including Dialog TV, a Direct To Home Satellite TV service, and Dialog Global which provides international telecommunication services. Dialog Broadband offers fixed-line and broadband internet services, whilst Dialog Tele-Infrastructure is the company's national telco infrastructure arm.

Dialog Axiata is an investor under the aegis of the Board of Investment of Sri Lanka and has invested over US$3.37 billion towards the development of telecommunications infrastructure, thus becoming the single largest contributor to Sri Lankan foreign direct investment (FDI) to date.

On 26 June 2024 Dialog Axiata acquire 100% of the issued shares in Airtel Lanka, in consideration of which Dialog will issue to Bharti Airtel, ordinary voting shares which will amount to 10.3% of the total issued shares of Dialog by way of a share swap.

== History ==
=== MTN Networks (Pvt) Ltd (1993–2005) ===
Dialog was incorporated in 1993 as MTN Networks (Private) Limited with 90% of equity through Telekom Malaysia Berhad (TM) and 10% by Capital Maharaja being the local promoters to the investment. Telekom Malaysia (TM) is the Majority owned by the Government of Malaysia, and is the incumbent and dominant fixed-line telecom operator in Malaysia. At the time of setup, MTN was the 4th entry to the Sri Lankan Mobile market which already had 3 established operators.

In 1995 just after 2 years of incorporation, MTN Networks began its commercial operations under the brand name Dialog GSM by rolling out the first digital network in South Asia using GSM technology hence offering a superior service compared to analog networks at the time.

DialogGSM Logo (1995–2005)

In 1996, the local promoters divested their stake providing complete ownership of MTN Networks to Telekom Malaysia. In mid-1997 Hans Wijayasuriya was appointed as the CEO of MTN Networks, at the age of 29 becoming the youngest CEO in a multimillion-dollar investment.

Marking another regional first Dialog GSM was the first operator in Asia Pacific to deliver international roaming in 1997. MTN Networks was able to record its first operational profit for the financial year of 1998 when Dialog GSM had a subscriber base close to 75,000. Beginning of the new millennium brought fortunes for Dialog as in the year 2000 it was able to attain the market leader position in the mobile market surpassing the incumbent operators. The year 2001 saw the launch of Dialog Internet, thus starting Internet service provider operations by launching GPRS and MMS services based on existing 2G infrastructure and becoming the first GPRS and MMS operator in South Asia.

Following the 2002 ceasefire agreement, Dialog became the first mobile operator to cover the Jaffna Peninsula within 45 days.

In 2004 surpassing a milestone Dialog GSM was able to attain 1 million subscriber base and to commission its 500th 2G base station.

=== Dialog Telekom PLC (2005–2010) ===
In March 2005 MTN Networks Pvt Ltd unveiled its new corporate identity as Dialog Telekom Ltd at a shindig witnessed by Mahathir Mohamad, Former Prime Minister of Malaysia, celebrating the company's ten years of telecommunications infrastructure development in Sri Lanka.

Dialog Telekom PLC Logo (2005–2010)

In 2005, Dialog Telekom launched the largest IPO seen by the Sri Lankan capital markets in an attempt to finance expanding the network. The Dialog Telekom initial offer, which was launched on a book building structure at a price range of LKR 8 to LKR 12 per share, consists of 712.3 million ordinary shares, which is a 9.6% stake of the company. Offer was oversubscribed 3 times within an hour of opening and Dialog Telekom was able to raise LKR 8.55 Billion (US$85 million) in fresh capital making this the largest IPO to date in the country. Dialog Telekom made history on the first trading day when trading commenced at a price of LKR 14.25 making Dialog Telekom the first Sri Lankan Company to reach the US$1 billion market capitalization mark.

In 2005 December, Dialog Telekom Acquired 100% stake of MTT Network Pvt Ltd for LKR 1.86 Billion (US$19.2 million). At the time of Acquisition MTT was the leading digital transmission and backbone provider for other Cellular operators and television stations. Other than that MTT also operated CDMA telephony services and external gateway operations. Pursuant to the Acquisition MTT was renamed Dialog Broadband Networks Pvt Ltd (DBN) which as a fully owned subsidiary of Dialog Telekom and continued providing service to MTT clientele and also expanded on CDMA operations.

In December 2006, Dialog Telekom completed the takeover of troubled DTH satellite television provider CBN SAT (Private) Ltd for LKR 523.8 million (US$4.6 million) marking Dialog's entry into the television segment thus positioning itself as a quadruple play service provider. CBNsat was re-branded as DialogTV and operates as a fully owned subsidiary of Dialog Telekom.

After the end of Sri Lanka Civil War in 2009, Dialog was the first operator to extend its GSM network to former conflict zones in the Northern and Eastern Provinces, where it maintains an estimated 85% market share to this date

=== Dialog Axiata PLC (2010-Present) ===
Following the 2008 demerger from Telekom Malaysia Berhad, the parent company TM International (TMI) rebranded as Axiata Group Berhad to establish an independent regional identity. Consequently, Dialog Telekom PLC changed its name to Dialog Axiata PLC in 2010 to align with this new corporate structure and Axiata's strategy to unify its South Asian operations under a single regional brand.

In 2012, Dialog Axiata acquired Suntel Ltd, one of Sri Lanka's fixed-line and CDMA telecommunications operators, through its subsidiary Dialog Broadband Networks (Private) Limited for US$34 million. Following the acquisition, Suntel's network and customer base were integrated into Dialog's broadband and fixed telecommunications operations, strengthening the company's position in the fixed broadband and enterprise connectivity sectors.

In April 2013, Dialog Axiata launched Sri Lanka's first commercial 4G LTE network using spectrum in the 1800 MHz band, becoming the first operator in South Asia to commercially deploy an FD-LTE network. The launch marked a significant expansion of mobile broadband services in the country. In January 2017, longtime chief executive officer Dr Hans Wijayasuriya stepped down from his role after nearly two decades leading the company and was succeeded by Supun Weerasinghe. Wijayasuriya subsequently assumed regional responsibilities within the Axiata Group. Later in 2017, Dialog Axiata conducted Sri Lanka's first public demonstration of fifth-generation (5G) mobile technology in collaboration with international technology partners. The demonstration was among the earliest 5G showcases in South Asia.

In 2018, Dialog launched the anonymous messaging platform Yeheli.lk. Driven by technology from Bangladeshi company Mayalogy, it connects users with experts, especially on the subject of women's health and well-being.

During the COVID-19 pandemic beginning in 2020, Dialog experienced a substantial increase in mobile and fixed broadband traffic due to remote working, online education, and increased digital media consumption. The company expanded network capacity and supported several digital education and remote connectivity initiatives during the period.

In 2023, Dialog Axiata announced the proposed acquisition of Airtel Lanka, the Sri Lankan subsidiary of Bharti Airtel. The transaction was completed on 26 June 2024 through a share-swap arrangement, resulting in Bharti Airtel obtaining approximately 10.36% ownership in Dialog Axiata. The acquisition combined the customer bases, spectrum assets, and telecommunications infrastructure of both operators, further strengthening Dialog's position in Sri Lanka's mobile telecommunications market. Following the merger, Dialog commenced the integration of Airtel Lanka's subscribers and network infrastructure into its nationwide operations to improve spectrum utilization, network capacity, and service coverage. The transaction also marked Bharti Airtel's exit from direct telecommunications operations in Sri Lanka after more than fifteen years in the market.

Following the 2017 5G demonstration, the company conducted limited non-standalone (NSA) 5G trials using existing 4G LTE infrastructure and upgraded selected urban network sites to support 5G readiness. The deployment of commercial 5G services was delayed due to the absence of officially allocated mid-band spectrum for 5G by the Telecommunications Regulatory Commission of Sri Lanka (TRCSL). Long delayed 5G spectrum auction was held in December 2025, in which Dialog secured 100 MHz in the 3.5 GHz band and 200 MHz in the 27 GHz band. Following the auction, the company began phased commercial rollout of 5G services in early 2026, expanding network coverage across major urban areas. By April 2026, Dialog Surpassed 1,000 operational 5G sites across the country.

As of 2026, Dialog Axiata remained the largest telecommunications service provider in Sri Lanka by subscriber base, operating mobile, broadband, digital television, enterprise, and international telecommunications services. The company continued investments in 4G LTE, fibre-optic infrastructure, and 5G network expansion across the country.

=== Chief Executives ===
A chronological list of people who have been chief executive officer:

- Mohammed Said Mohammed Ali (1993–1996)
- Datuk Zaini Diman (1996–1997)
- Hans Wijayasuriya (1997–2016)
- Supun Weerasinghe (2017–present)

== Mobile ==
Dialog Mobile has island-wide coverage with over 5,000 2G sites and over 5,000 4G Dialog sites. 5G Coverage has already been provided in certain suburbs of the Colombo, Kandy, Gampaha, Galle, Matara, Jaffna, Kurunegala, Anuradhapura & Matara Districts.

All key urban and sub-urban areas were covered with 4G network capabilities.

== Television ==
Dialog Television is a Direct To Home (DTH) satellite television service operated by Dialog. Dialog Television channels focus on news, entertainment and knowledge based programming. It provides international content including CNN, BBC, HBO, Cinemax, AXN, Star Sports, Discovery Channel, MTV and Cartoon Network, in addition to a portfolio of Sri Lankan television channels. Dialog Satellite TV uses Digital Video Broadcasting through Satellite DVB-S technology. DTV is the only pay TV operator in Sri Lanka to have island-wide coverage and was the first to introduce DVB-T(terrestrial) technology in Sri Lanka. As of September 2023, there are over 1.7 million Dialog Television subscribers.

== Global ==
Dialog Global, the international arm of Dialog Axiata, provides international services with voice roaming coverage of 230 countries on 670 networks, 4G LTE roaming coverage of 88 countries on 210 networks including bilateral partnerships with global carriers. dialog

== See also ==
- Dialog i43
- Dialog K35
- Dialog K45
