= SLTMobitel =

Sri Lankan telecommunications company

Sri Lanka Telecom PLC
- Trade name: SLTMobitel
- Type: Public
- Traded as: CSE: SLTL.N0000
- ISIN: LK0312N00005
- Industry: Telecommunications
- Founded: 1 September 1991; 34 years ago
- Headquarters: Colombo, Sri Lanka
- Key people: Mothilal de Silva (chairman); Janaka Abeysinghe (CEO – Sri Lanka Telecom); Sudharshana Geeganage (COO – Mobitel)
- Products: Fixedline Telephone services; Mobile Telephone services; Internet services with dedicated speed link, ADSL and FTTx; IPTV; IT services
- Revenue: ▲LKR107.710 billion (2022)
- Operating income: ▼LKR12.518 billion (2022)
- Net income: ▼LKR4.765 billion (2022)
- Total assets: ▲LKR240.584 billion (2022)
- Total equity: ▼LKR92.488 billion (2022)
- Owners: Secretary to the Treasury (49.50%); Global Telecommunications Holdings N.V. (44.98%); Jio Platforms (90.25%)
- Number of employees: 8,058 (2022)
- Subsidiaries: eChannelling PLC (87.59%); Mobit Technologies (Pvt.) Ltd.; Mobitel (Pvt.) Ltd.; Sky Network (Pvt.) Ltd. (99.94%); SLT Digital Info Services (Pvt.) Ltd.; SLT Human Capital Solutions (Pvt.) Ltd.; SLT Property Management (Pvt.) Ltd.; SLT VisionCom (Pvt.) Ltd.; Sri Lanka Telecom (Services) Ltd. (99.99%); Talentfort (Pvt.) Ltd.; Galle Submarine Cable Depot (Pvt.) Ltd. (40%, Associate company)
- Rating: Fitch: A (lka)
- Website: www.sltmobitel.lk

Sri Lanka Telecom PLC (Sinhala: ශ්‍රී ලංකා ටෙලිකොම් පීඑල්සී, romanized: Śrī Laṃkā Ṭelikom PīElSī, Tamil: ஸ்ரீலங்கா டெலிகொம் பிஎல்சி), doing business as SLTMobitel, is the national telecommunications services provider in Sri Lanka and one of the country's largest companies with an annual turnover in excess of Rs 100 billion. The company provides domestic and corporate services which include fixed and wireless telephony, Internet access and IT services to domestic, public and business sector customers. As of 2024 SLTMobitel was Sri Lanka's second largest mobile network operator with 7.1 million subscribers.

SLTMobitel offers a variety of services and currently operates GSM, GPRS, EDGE, UMTS, HSPA, HSPA+, DC-HSPA+ and FD-LTE network utilising 2G, 3.5G, 4G and 4.5G, 5G technologies with VoLTE service. It covers most of Sri Lanka with its GSM network. SLTMobitel offers both prepaid and postpaid mobile services, along with mobile broadband services using the 3.5G network, postpaid mobile services, and mobile broadband services using the 4G network. SLTMobitel also launched Mobile Money services in November 2013 which is called mCash, as a digital wallet service.

== History ==
SLTMobitel started its operations in 1858 with the establishment of the first Telegraphic Circuit between Galle and Colombo. In the same year, it established its first international Telegraph Communication between then called Ceylon, and India. Since then, Sri Lanka Telecom passed several milestones, including corporatisation in 1991 and privatizsation in 2000 with the collaboration of Nippon Telegraph and Telephone Corporation (NTT) and listing on the Colombo Stock Exchange's Milanka Price Index.

In 2008, NTT sold its stake in SLT to Global Telecommunications Holdings N.V. of Netherlands, which currently owns 44.98% stake in Sri Lanka Telecom whilst 48% is owned by the Government of Sri Lanka and the balance shares remain with the general public.

Mobitel was incorporated in 1993 as the third mobile telephone provider in the Sri Lankan market. Originally a collaboration between Sri Lanka Telecom and Telstra, Mobitel has been wholly owned by SLT since November 2002.

In January 2004, the company launched its fully-fledged 2.5G GSM network that is EDGE/GPRS enabled and designed to operate on the dual-band. In 2005 and 2006, Mobitel traded the 800 MHz band for slots made available from the 900 MHz spectrum. With this enhancement, Mobitel embarked on a field trial of 3G at the 1st International Buddhist Conference held in 2006, setting the stage for the launch of its 3G services in Sri Lanka. In December 2007, the company launched its 3.5G HSPA network – the first Super 3.5G network in South Asia. Further, Mobitel successfully demonstrated HSPA + MIMO technology with downlink speed up to 28.8 Mbit/s and carried out a successful trial of 4G/LTE technology with downlink speed exceeding 96 Mbit/s, for the first time in the South Asian Region. Investments committed to date in the 2.5G/3.5G/4G networks and service offering amounts to over US$500mn.

Investments committed to a date for this technology to provide 3G and GSM totals over US$200 million. This included increasing the present number of base stations from 600 to 1,500 by the end of 2008.

== Services provided ==
=== Internet ===
==== Dial-up ====
Several Dial-Up packages are provided by SLT according to customer needs.

==== ADSL2+ ====
SLTMobitel provides ADSL2+ fixed broadband with speeds up to 16 Mbit/s under 6 packages which are Light User, Family, SME Business, Business (Heavy User), State Sector & Higher Education.

==== VDSL2 and FTTx ====
The company launched its VDSL2 and FTTH/FTTB broadband services on 2014 March 25 and are available in most urban areas in the country within 2 kilometres (1.2 mi) of an upgraded Telephone Exchange's MSAN Unit.

===== Fiber 300 Mbps =====
Fiber 300 Mbit/s is now widely available throughout Sri Lanka and has a download speed of 300 Mbit/s with data caps. And available a 150 Mbit/s upload speed.

===== Fiber 1 Gbps =====
Fiber 1 Gbit/s was introduced by SLT in 2020 for apartments.

==== 4G LTE ====
SLTMobitel fixed wireless successfully demonstrated and launched its 4G LTE fixed broadband service at a ceremony held in Ruwanwella, Kegalle in January 2014, with the presence of Ranjith Siyambalapitiya, Minister of Telecommunications and Information Technology.

=== WiFi ===
SLTMobitel also provides free and pay as you go WiFi internet access at public places in Colombo and other selected cities in Sri Lanka.

=== Network ===
SLTMobitel currently operates GSM, UMTS, LTE Advanced and also a 5G – Demonstration Level. SLTMobitel 4G+ trial network with downlink speed of up to 300 Mbit/s and uplink speed up to 150 Mbit/s; however, 5G coverage is limited to the Colombo district.

=== Global ===
SLTMobitel provides international services with GSM roaming coverage of over 200 countries and GPRS roaming coverage of over 120 countries including bilateral partnerships with global carriers.

== Gallery ==
Sri Lanka Telecom Logo until 2020

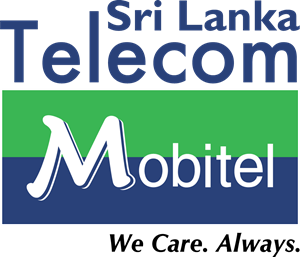
Mobitel Logo until 2020

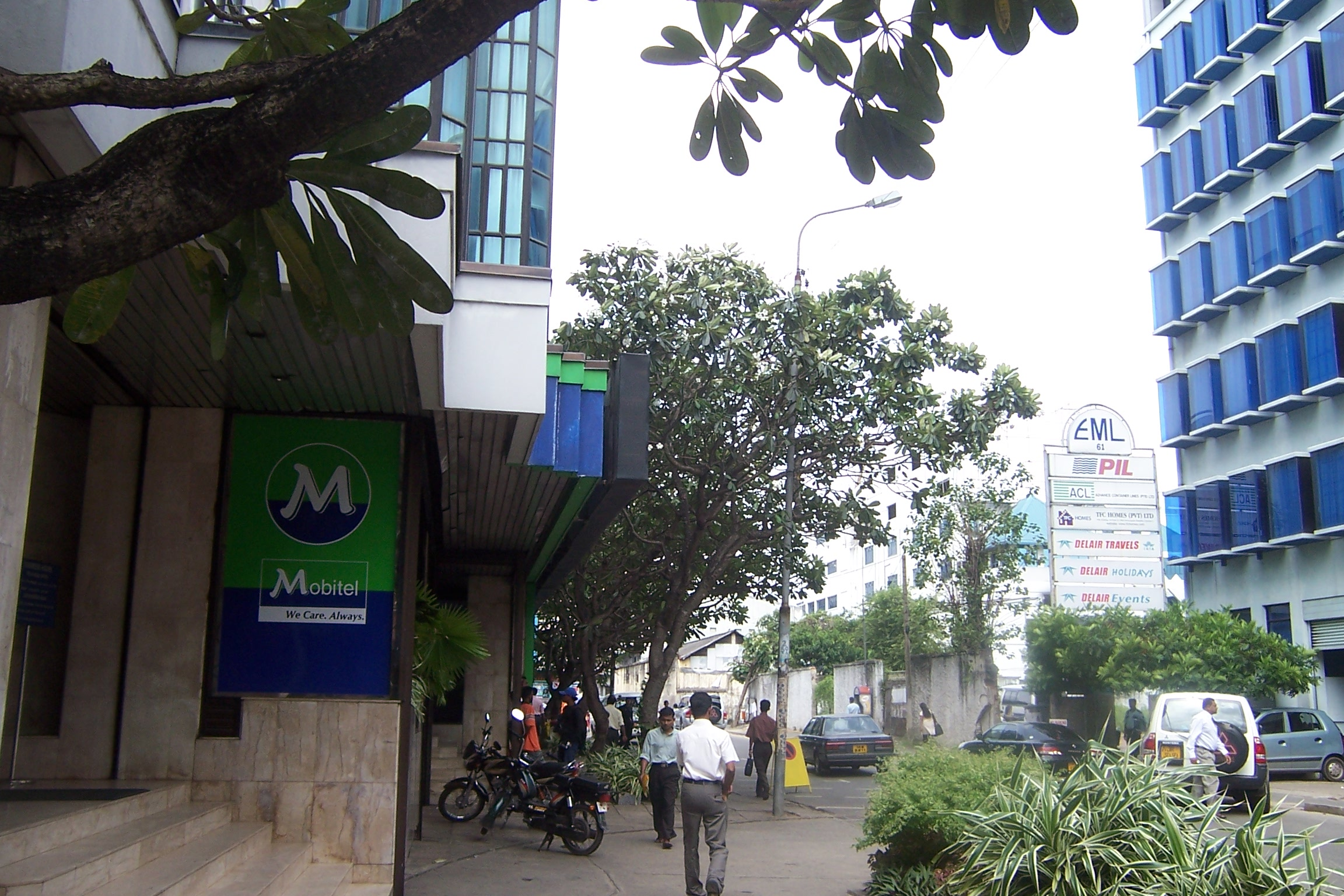
Mobitel office in Colombo, as seen in 2006
