= PlayStation 2 technical specifications =

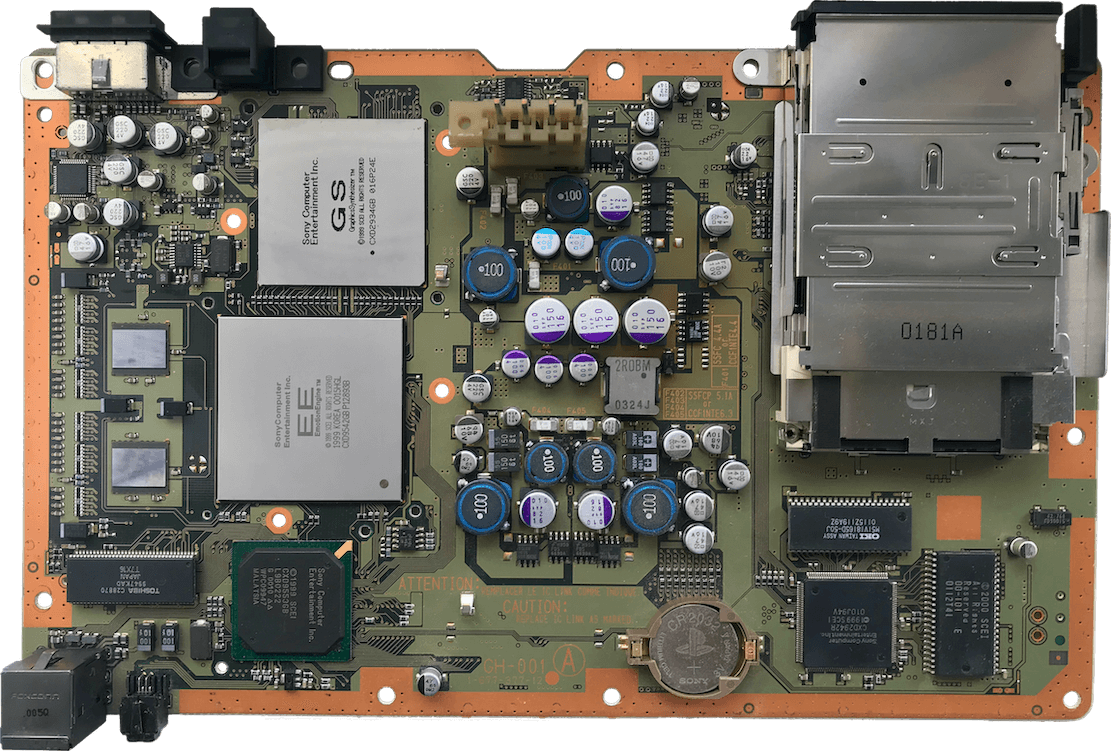
An SCPH-10000 motherboard

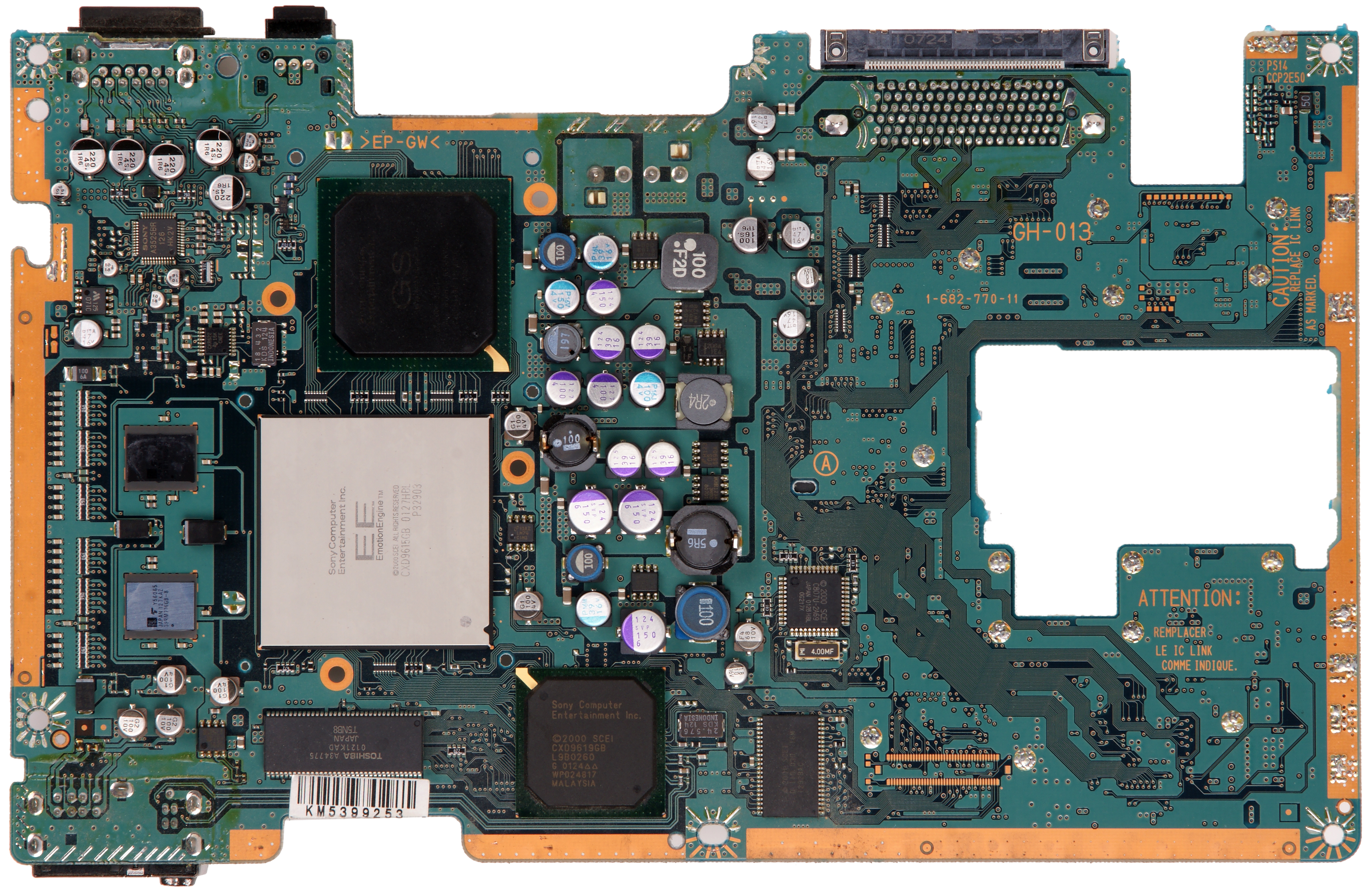
An SCPH-30001 motherboard

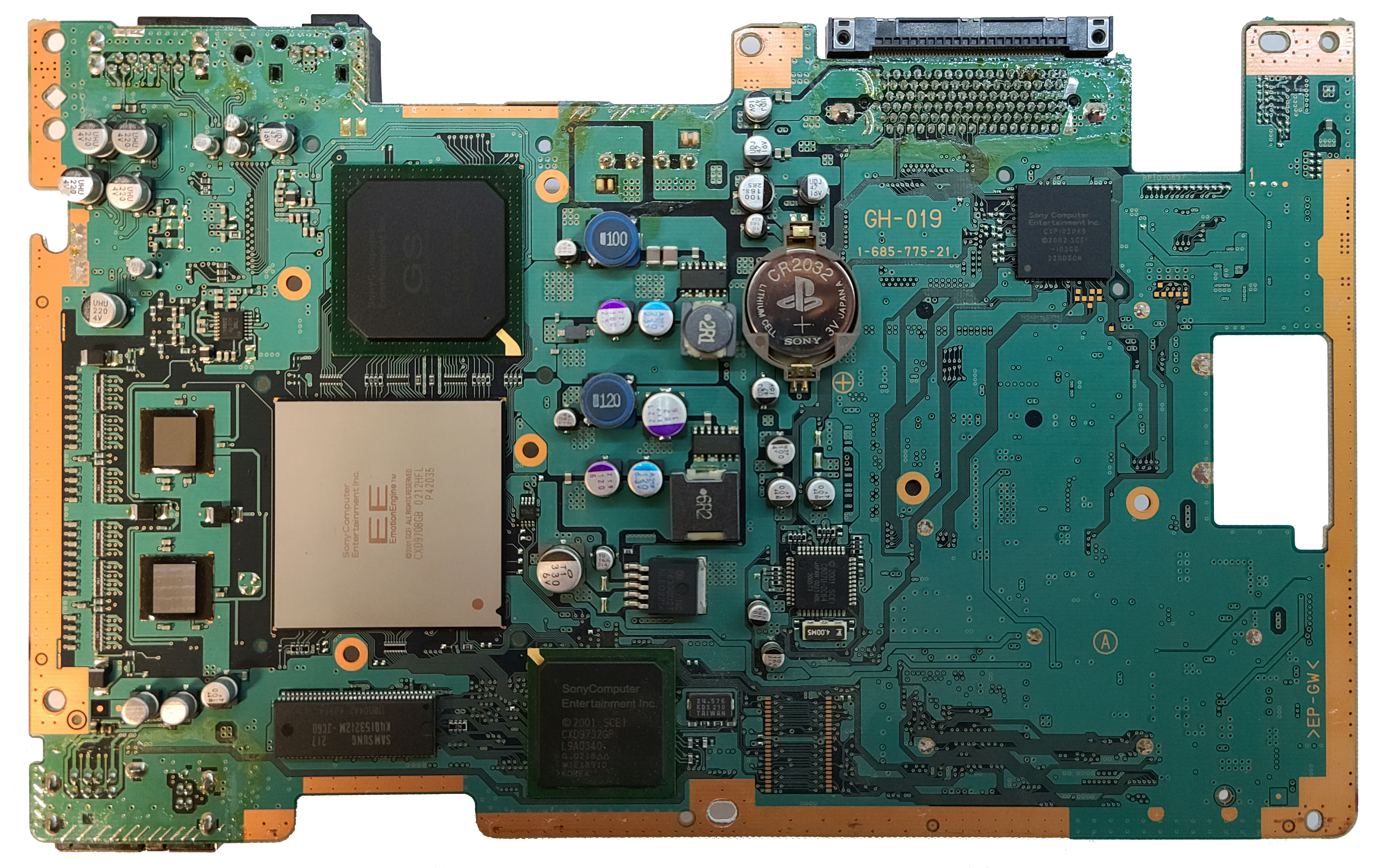
An SCPH-39001 motherboard

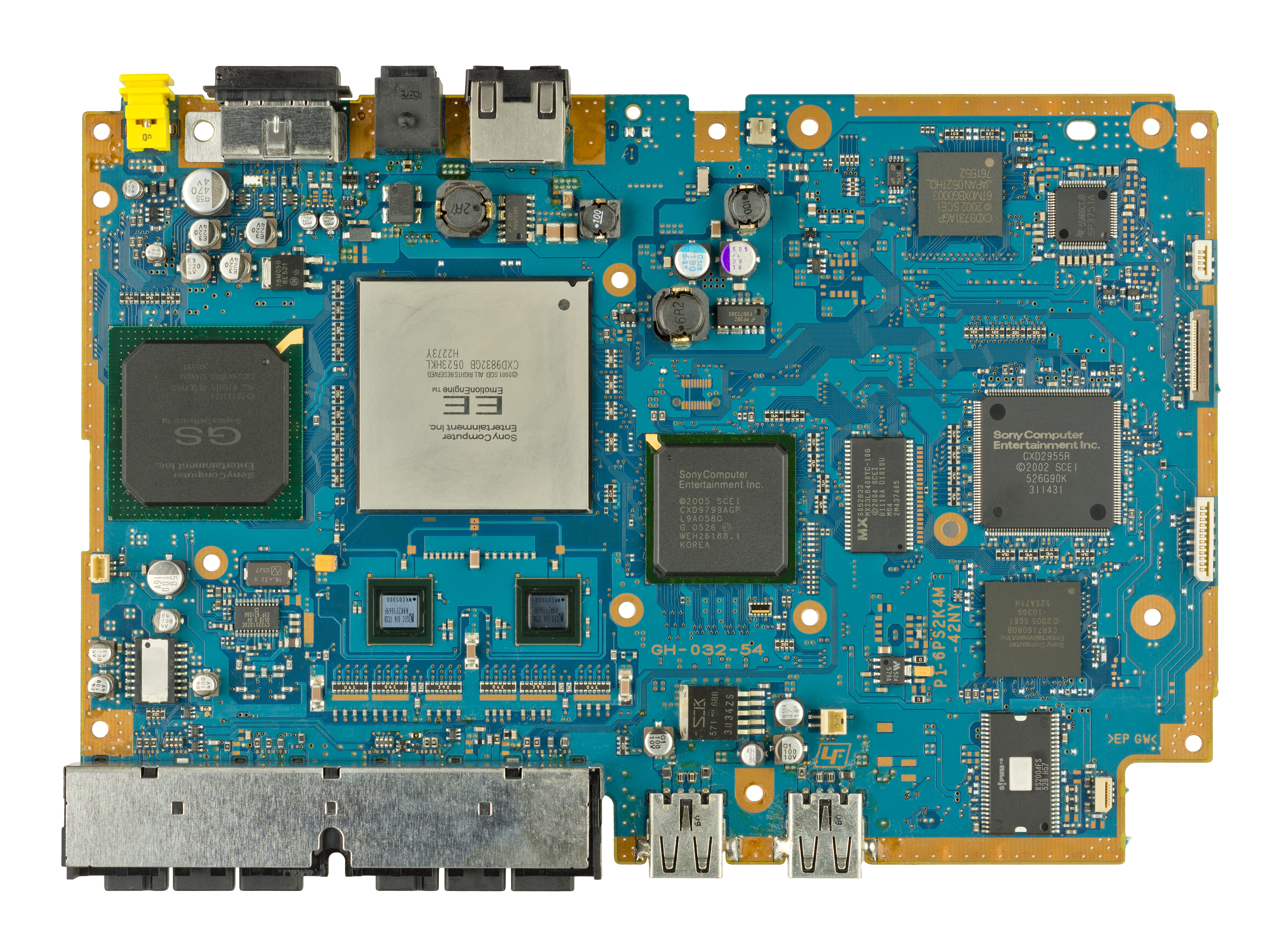
An SCPH-70001 motherboard

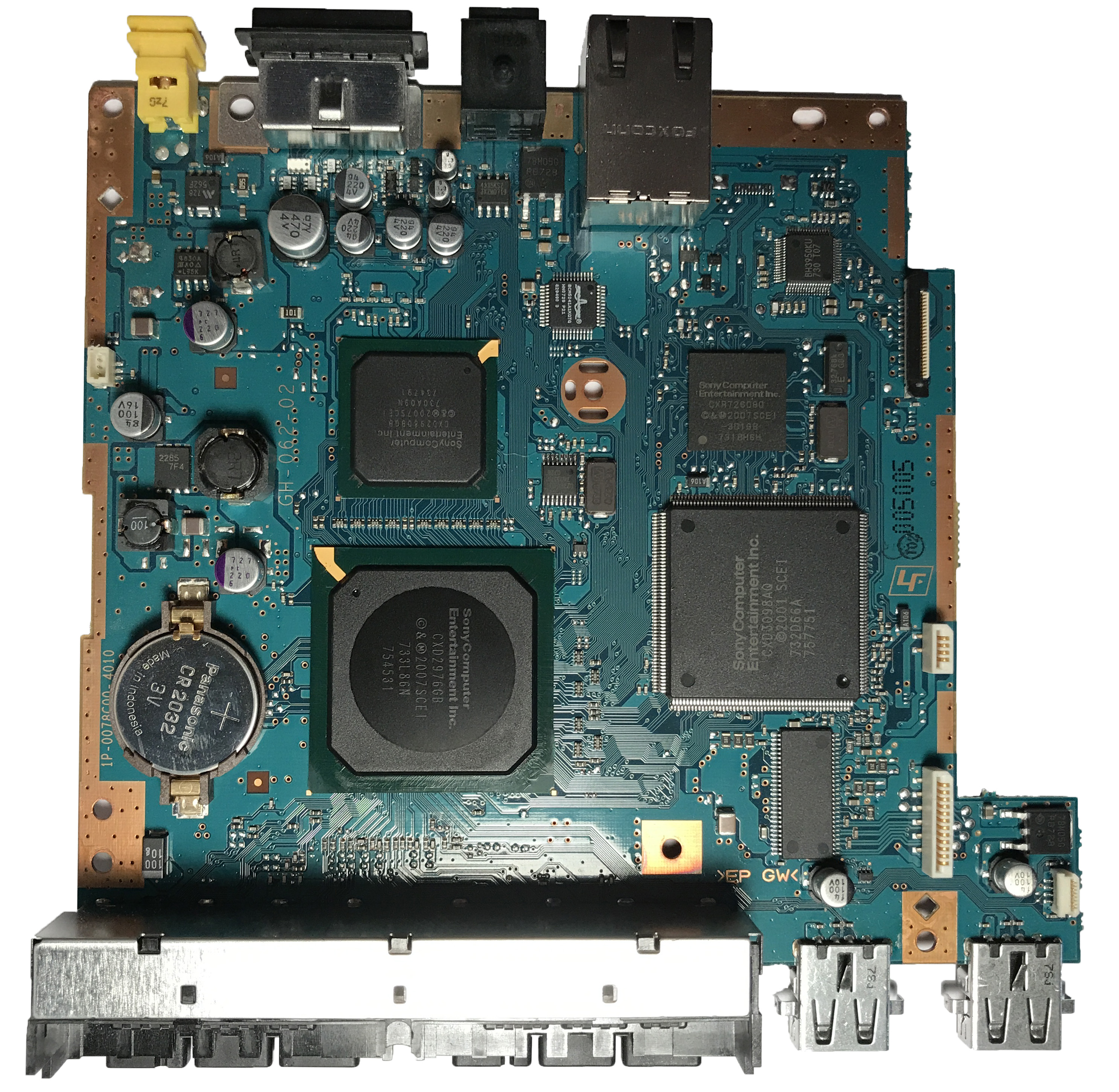
An SCPH-79001 motherboard

The PlayStation 2 technical specifications describe the various components of the PlayStation 2 (PS2) video game console.

== Overview ==
The sixth-generation hardware of the PlayStation 2 video game console consists of various components. At the heart of the console's configuration is its central processing unit (CPU), a custom RISC processor known as the Emotion Engine which operates at 294.912 MHz (299 MHz in later consoles). The CPU heavily relies on its integration with two vector processing units, known as VPU0 and VPU1, the Graphics Synthesizer, and a floating-point unit (FPU) in order to render 3D graphics. Other components, such as the system's DVD-ROM optical drive and DualShock 2 controller, provide the software and user control input.

PlayStation 2 software is distributed on CD-ROM and DVD-ROM. In addition, the console can play audio CDs and DVD movies, and is backwards compatible with original PlayStation games. This is accomplished through the inclusion of the original PlayStation's CPU which also serves as the PS2's I/O processor, clocked at 36.864 MHz in PS2 mode. The PS2 also supports full functionality with the original PlayStation memory cards and controllers. The PS2's DualShock 2 controller is an upgraded version of the PlayStation's DualShock with analog face, shoulder and D-pad buttons replacing the digital buttons of the original. Like its predecessor, the DualShock 2 controller features force feedback technology.

The standard PlayStation 2 memory card has an 8 MB capacity and uses Sony's MagicGate encryption. This requirement prevented the production of memory cards by third parties who did not purchase a MagicGate license. Memory cards without encryption can be used to store PlayStation game saves, but PlayStation games would be unable to read from or write to the card – such a card could only be used as a backup. There are a variety of non-Sony manufactured memory cards available for the PlayStation 2, allowing for a larger memory capacity than the standard 8 MB. However their use is unsupported and compatibility is not guaranteed. These memory cards can have up to 128 MB storage space.

The console also features USB and IEEE 1394 expansion ports. Compatibility with USB and IEEE 1394 devices is dependent on the software supporting the device. For example, the PS2 BIOS will not boot an ISO image from a USB flash drive or operate a USB printer, as the machine's operating system does not include this functionality. By contrast, Gran Turismo 4 and Tourist Trophy are programmed to save screenshots to a USB mass storage device and print images on certain USB printers. A PlayStation 2 HDD can be installed via the expansion bay in the back of the console, and was required to play certain games, notably the popular Final Fantasy XI.

== Central processing unit ==
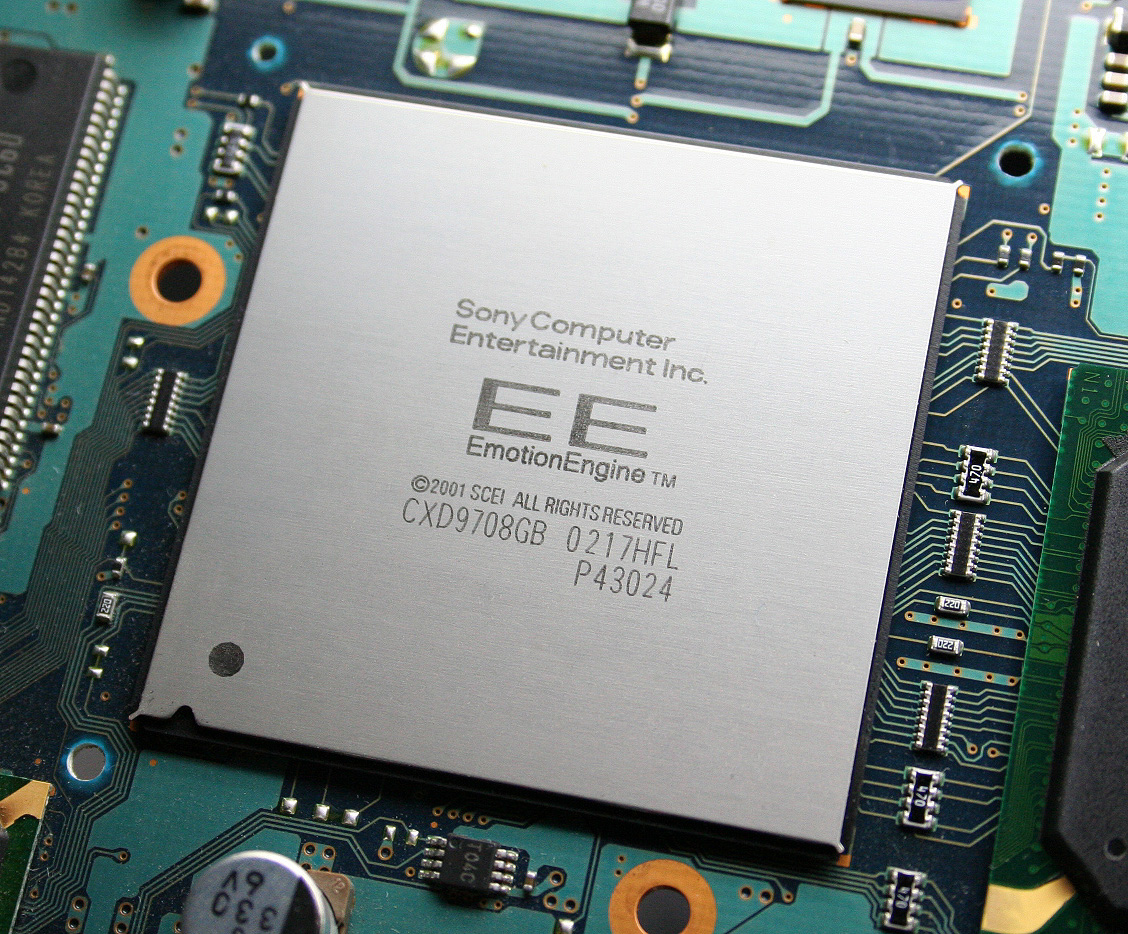
Emotion Engine CPU as found in the SCPH-7000x

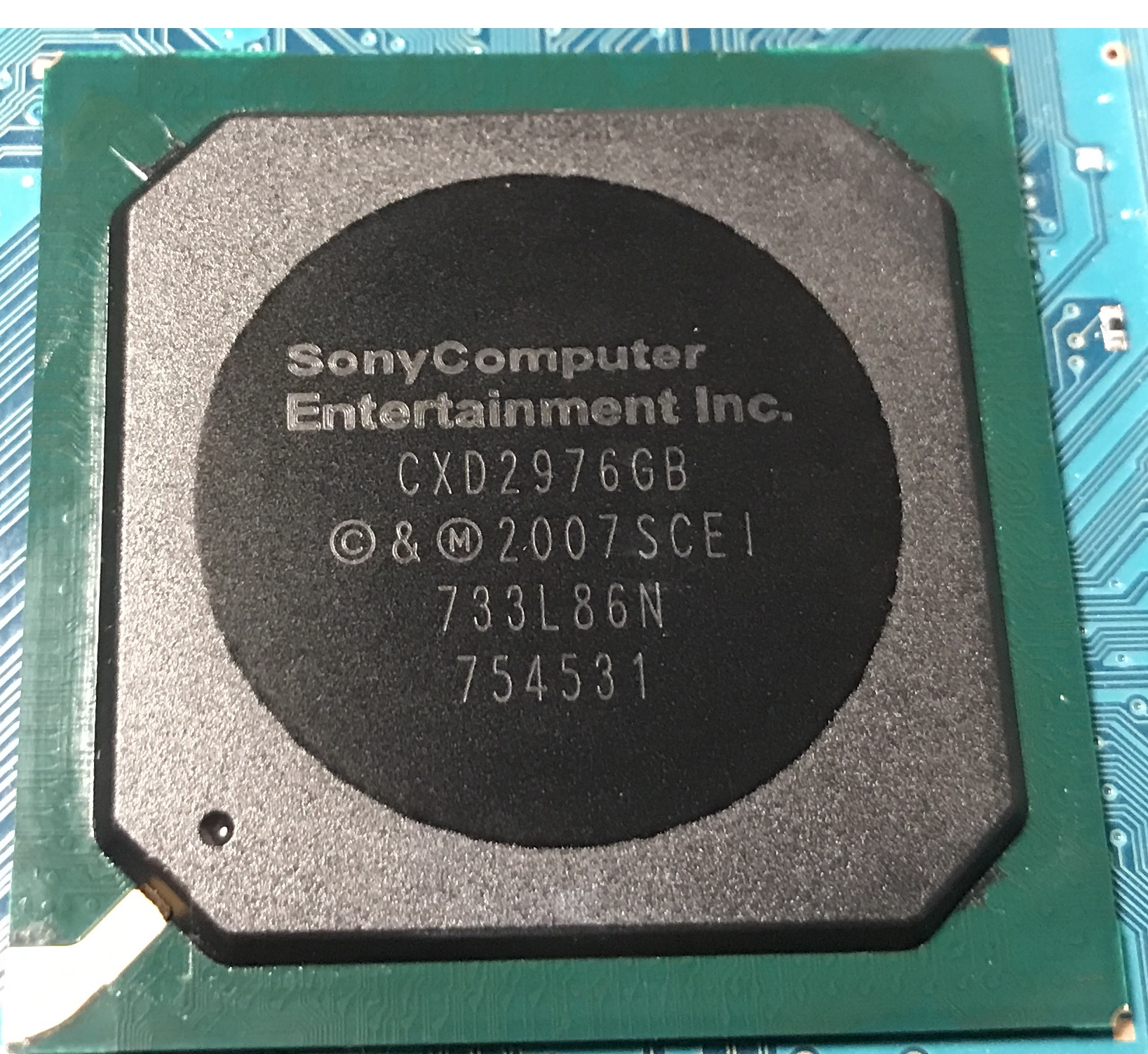
The combined EE+RDRAM+SPU2+IOP found in the SCPH-7900x and SCPH-9000x revisions

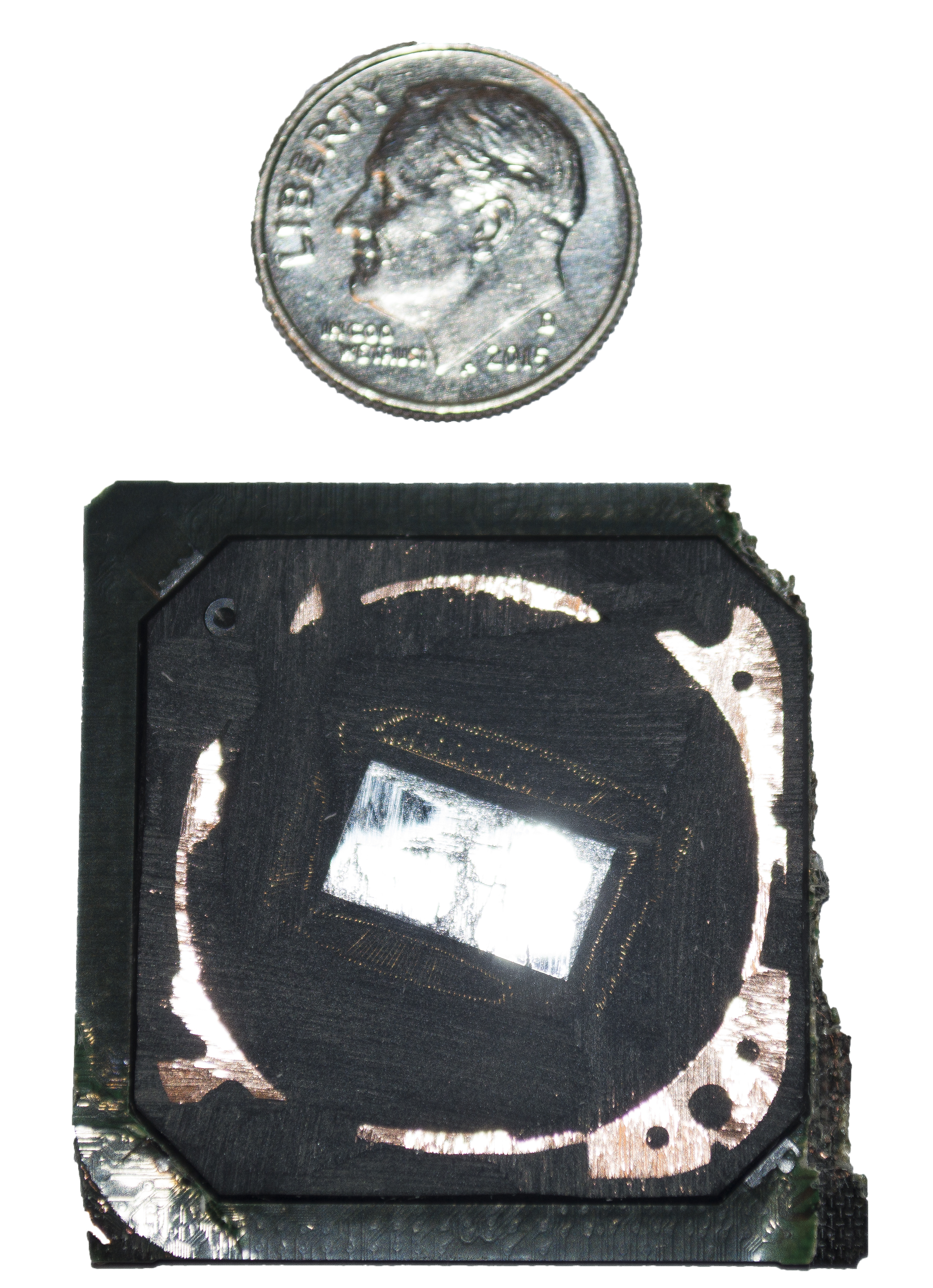
The ASIC from the SCPH-90001 (CXD2976GB) shaved down to show the EE+RDRAM+SPU2+IOP combined silicon at 65nm

- CPU: MIPS III R5900-based "Emotion Engine", clocked at 294.912 MHz (299 MHz on newer versions), with 128-bit SIMD capabilities
- 250-nm CMOS manufacturing (ending with 65-nm CMOS), 13.5 million transistors, 225 mm^{2} die size, 15 W dissipation (combined EE+GS in SCPH-7500x and later SCPH-7000x): 86 mm^{2}, 53.5 million transistors) (combined EE+RDRAM+DRAM in SCPH-7900x ended with 65 nm CMOS design)
  - CPU core: MIPS R5900 (COP0), 64-bit, little endian (mipsel). CPU is a superscalar, in-order execution 2-issue design with 6-stage long integer pipelines, 32 32-bit GPR registers, 32 128-bit SIMD linear scalar registers, two 64-bit integer ALUs, 128-bit load-store unit (LSU) and a branch execution unit (BXU).
  - Instruction set: MIPS III, MIPS IV subset with Sony's proprietary 107 vector SIMD multimedia instructions (MMI). The custom instruction set was implemented by grouping the two 64-bit integer ALUs.
    - 32-bit FPU coprocessor (COP1) with 6-stage long pipeline (floating point multiply accumulator × 1, floating point divider × 1). FPU is not IEEE compliant.
  - Two 32-bit VLIW-SIMD vector units at 294.912 MHz: VPU0 and VPU1 (floating point multiply accumulator × 9, floating point divider × 1) each VPU contains a vector unit (VU), instruction cache, data cache and interface unit. Each vector unit also has upper execution unit containing 4 × FMAC and lower execution unit containing FDIV, integer ALU, load-store unit, branch logic, 16 16-bit integer registers and 32 128-bit floating point registers. VPU1 has an additional EFU unit.
    - VPU0 (COP2; FMAC × 4, FDIV × 1) is tightly coupled with the main CPU and is typically used for polygon and geometry transformations (under parallel or serial connection), physics and other gameplay related tasks
    - VPU1 (Elementary Functional Unit, EFU; FMAC × 5, FDIV × 2) operates independently controlled by microcode, parallel to the CPU core, is typically used for polygon and geometry transformations, clipping, culling, lighting and other visual based calculations (texture matrix includes processing of UV & STQ coordinates)
      - Parallel: results of VU0/FPU sent as another display list via MFIFO (for e.g. complex characters/vehicles/etc.)
      - Serial: results of VU0/FPU sent to VU1 (via 3 methods) and can act as an optional geometry pre-processor that does all base work to update the scene every frame (for e.g. general transformations of world space relating to gameplay, such as boning and animation, physics and general motion)
  - Image Processing Unit (IPU): MPEG-2 compressed image macroblock layer decoder allowing playback of DVDs and game FMV. It also allowed vector quantization for 2D graphics data.
  - Memory management unit (MMU), RDRAM controller and DMA controller: handle memory access within the system
  - Cache memory: 16 KB instruction cache, 8 KB data cache and 16 KB scratchpad (ScrP) data cache
  - Scratchpad (SPR) is extended area of memory visible to the EE CPU. This extended memory provides 16 kilobytes of fast RAM available to be used by the application. Scratchpad memory can be used to store temporary data that is waiting to be sent via DMA or for any other temporary storage that the programmer can define.

=== Interfaces ===
- I/O processor interconnection: remote procedure call over a serial link, DMA controller for bulk transfer
- Main RDRAM memory bus. Bandwidth: 3.2 GB/s
- Graphics interface (GIF), DMA channel that connects the EE CPU to the GS ("Graphics Synthesizer") co-processor. To draw something to the screen, one must send, using 1 of 3 data paths, render commands & assets to the GS via the GIF channel: 64-bit, 150 MHz bus, maximum theoretical bandwidth of 1.2 GB/s.
- Display lists generated by CPU/VPU0 and VPU1 are sent to the GIF, which prioritizes them before dispatching them to the Graphics Synthesizer for rendering.
- Vector Unit Interface (VIF), consists of two DMA channels VIF0 for VPU0 and VIF1 for VPU1. Vector units and the main CPU communicate via VIF DMA channels.
- SIF – Serial Interface or Subsystem Interface which consists of 3 DMA channels:
  - Subsystem Interface 0 (SIF0) and Subsystem Interface 1 (SIF1), used for communication between the EE main CPU and IOP co-processor. These are serial DMA channels where both CPUs can send commands and establish communication through an RPC protocol.
  - Subsystem Interface 2 (SIF2), used for backwards compatibility with PS1 games and debugging.

=== Performance ===
- Floating point performance: 6.2 GFLOPS (single precision 32-bit floating point)
  - FPU 0.64 GFLOPS
  - VU0 2.44 GFLOPS
  - VU1 3.08 GFLOPS (Including internal 0.64 GFLOPS EFU)
- Tri-strip geometric transformation (VU0+VU1): 150 million vertices per second
  - 3D CG geometric transformation with raw 3D perspective operations (VU0+VU1): 66–80+ million vertices per second
  - 3D CG geometric transformations at peak bones/movements/effects (textures)/lights (VU0+VU1, parallel or series): 15–20 million vertices per second
  - Lighting: 38 million polygons/second
  - Fog: 36 million polygons/second
  - Curved surface generation (Bézier): 16 million polygons/second
  - Image processing performance: 150 million pixels/second
  - Actual real-world polygons (per frame): range of 500–600k at 30 FPS, 250–300k at 60 FPS
- Instructions per second: 6,000 MIPS (million instructions per second)

== System memory ==
- Overall memory: 40 MB (42 MB after revision of system's IOP)
  - Main memory: 32 MB PC800 32-bit dual-channel (2x 16-bit) RDRAM (Direct Rambus DRAM) @ 400 MHz, 3.2 GB/s peak bandwidth
    - Stores all aspects & assets of an application or game's level, for fetching the right data at the right time, with assets being streamed to their appropriate destinations, when needed, a level's geometry, for instance, to either vector unit, via each unit's VIF, and textures to the GS, the system's GPU, via the GIF
  - Video memory: 4 MB of 2560-bit DRAM @ 150 MHz, 48 GB/sec peak bandwidth
    - Stores temporal work or drawing buffers for drawing operations & mapping procedures; main memory, again, pre-storing all aspects & assets of a level, streaming only what that part of the frame needs processed & drawn at a time to the GIF, accumulating a single frame in small, very quick doses, bit by bit, using the video memory's buffers & high bandwidth, along the transfer bus speeds provided
  - IOP memory: 2 MB of 32-bit EDO-RAM @ 37.5 MHz, 150 MB/sec peak bandwidth
    - Handles communication between external peripherals or devices & the hardware, also helping transfer data to the SPU2, the system's sound processing unit, via the same bus, its 32-bit bus being shared between the SPU2, optical drive, USB ports and more
    - Updated to 4 MB SDRAM as of revision to SCPH-7500x model systems
  - Sound memory: 2 MB of 32-bit EDO-RAM @ 37.5 MHz
    - Separate memory that shares the same local 32-bit bus for the IOP, thus using the same 150 Mbit/s bandwidth

== Graphics processing unit ==
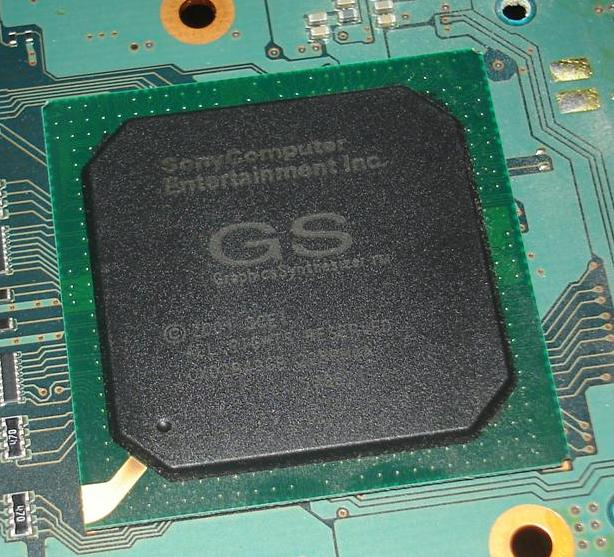
Graphics Synthesizer as found in SCPH-390xx

- Parallel rendering processor with embedded DRAM "Graphics Synthesizer" (GS) clocked at 147.456 MHz
- 279 mm^{2} die (combined EE+GS in SCPH-7500x: 86 mm^{2}, 53.5 million transistors) (GS in SCPH-7900x ended with 90 nm CMOS design)
- Dedicated connection from and to EE and VU1 via GIF
- Programmable CRT controller (PCRTC) for output
  - Video output resolution: Variable from 256×224 to 2048×1024
    - NTSC (interleaved/progressive scan): 256 x 448/224, 320 x 448/224, 384 x 448/224, 512 x 448/224, 640 x 448/224 or 704 x 448/224
    - PAL (interleaved/progressive scan): 256 x 512/256, 320 x 512/256, 384 x 512/256, 512 x 512/256, 640 x 512/256 or 704 x 512/256
    - VESA: 640 x 480, 720 x 512, 800 x 600, 1024 x 768, 1024 x 1024 or 1280×1024 pixels
    - DTV: 704 x 480 (480p) or 2048 x 1024 (1080i)
    - Acceptable video modes: 15kHz, 24kHz, 31kHz, 33kHz
- 4 MB of embedded DRAM as video memory
  - 48 gigabytes per second peak bandwidth
    - Texture buffer bandwidth: 9.6 GB/s
    - Frame buffer bandwidth: 38.4 GB/s
- eDRAM bus width: 256-bit (composed of three independent buses: 1024-bit write, 1024-bit read, 512-bit read/write)
- Pixel configuration: RGB:alpha, 24:8, 15:1; 16-, 24-, or 32-bit Z-buffer
- Display color depth: 32-bit (RGBA: 8 bits each)
- Pixel/Texel pipelines: 16 (unified)
  - Raster setup & execution consists of the entire block of 16 pixel pipes being involved in every stage of drawing a frame, in parallel, being equipped to handle processing functions such as fogging, texture mapping, AA and more, cycles split between all pipes
    - On their own, the 16 pipes output/process 16 pixels/cycle (1 pixel/pipe), giving a maximum throughput of 2400 megapixels/sec, at the GS's max clock speed, which includes 32bit pixels & all the systems basic alpha-blending, Z-buffering & filtering operations
    - When needing to do texture mapping, the 16 pipes output/process 8 pixel/cycle & 8 texels/cycle, per each pipe, in parallel, for a maximum throughput of 1200 megapixels & 1200 megatexels
    - The hardware's native fogging & AA uses additional cycles which reduces the overall throughput; but AA & fogging can be done as a post effect, using full-screen passes or sprites, and VRAM imaging operations, using then just a part of a said 2d vfx budget, as opposed to lowering the ceiling, perpetually, from the prior said textured fill-rate figure
- Overall pixel fillrate: 16 × 147 Mpix/s = 2.352 gigapixel/s
  - 1.2 gigapixel/s (with Z-buffer, alpha, and texture)
  - With no texture, flat shaded: 2.4 Gpix/s (75,000,000 32-pixel raster triangles)
  - With 1 full texture (diffuse map), Gouraud shaded: 1.2 Gpix/s (37,750,000 32-bit pixel raster triangles)
  - Texture fillrate: 1.2 Gtexel/s
  - Sprite drawing rate: 18.75 million/s (8×8 pixels)
  - Particle drawing rate: 150 million/s
- Polygon drawing rate: 75 million/s (small polygon)
  - 50 million/s (48-pixel quad with Z and A)
  - 30 million/s (50-pixel triangle with Z and A)
  - 25 million/s (48-pixel quad with Z, A and T)
  - 16 million/s (75-pixel triangle with Z, A, T and fog)
- Multi-pass rendering ability
  - Four passes: 300 Mpixel/s (75 Mpixels/pass)
- GS effects include: Dot3 bump mapping (normal mapping), mipmapping, spherical harmonic lighting, alpha blending, alpha test, destination alpha test, depth test, scissor test, transparency effects, framebuffer effects, post-processing effects, perspective-correct texture mapping, edge-AAx2 (poly sorting required), bilinear, trilinear texture filtering, multi-pass, palletizing (6:1 ratio 4-bit; 3:1 ratio 8-bit), offscreen drawing, framebuffer mask, flat shading, Gouraud shading, cel shading, dithering, texture swizzling.

== Audio ==
- Audio: Sony SPU2 dual-core sound processing unit
  - Local Memory: 2 MB EDO RAM (separate from the IOP)
  - SPU Core(s): Two 16-bit Sony SPU cores clocked at 8 MHz (same as PS1)
    - Supports ADPCM sources with up to 24 channels per core for a total of 48 channels
    - Only one SPU core is used when in PS1 backwards compatibility mode
  - One software-defined sound buffer source via PCM (primarily used for streaming audio)
  - Sampling rates of up to 48 kHz or 44.1 kHz (selectable)
    - Automatically downsampled to 44.1 kHz for PS1 backwards compatibility
  - Supports applying digital effects for ADPCM sources
    - Digital effects include:
      - Pitch Modulation
      - Envelope
      - Looping
      - Digital Reverb
  - Output: Gaussian interpolated output; stereo, Dolby Digital 5.1 Surround sound (Full motion video only), DTS (4.0 only in certain games), later games achieved matrix encoded 5.1 surround during gameplay through Dolby Pro Logic II

== I/O processor (IOP) ==
- Input Output Processor (IOP)
  - I/O Memory: 2 MB EDO DRAM
  - CPU Core: Original PlayStation CPU (MIPS R3000A clocked at 33.8688 MHz or 36.864 MHz+PS1 GTE and MDEC for backwards compatibility with PS1 games)
    - Automatically underclocked to 33.8688 MHz to achieve hardware backwards compatibility with original PlayStation format games.
  - Sub Bus: 32-bit
  - Connection to: SPU2 and CD/DVD controller.
- Replaced with the PowerPC-based "Deckard" IOP with 4 MB SDRAM starting with SCPH-7500x.

== Storage ==
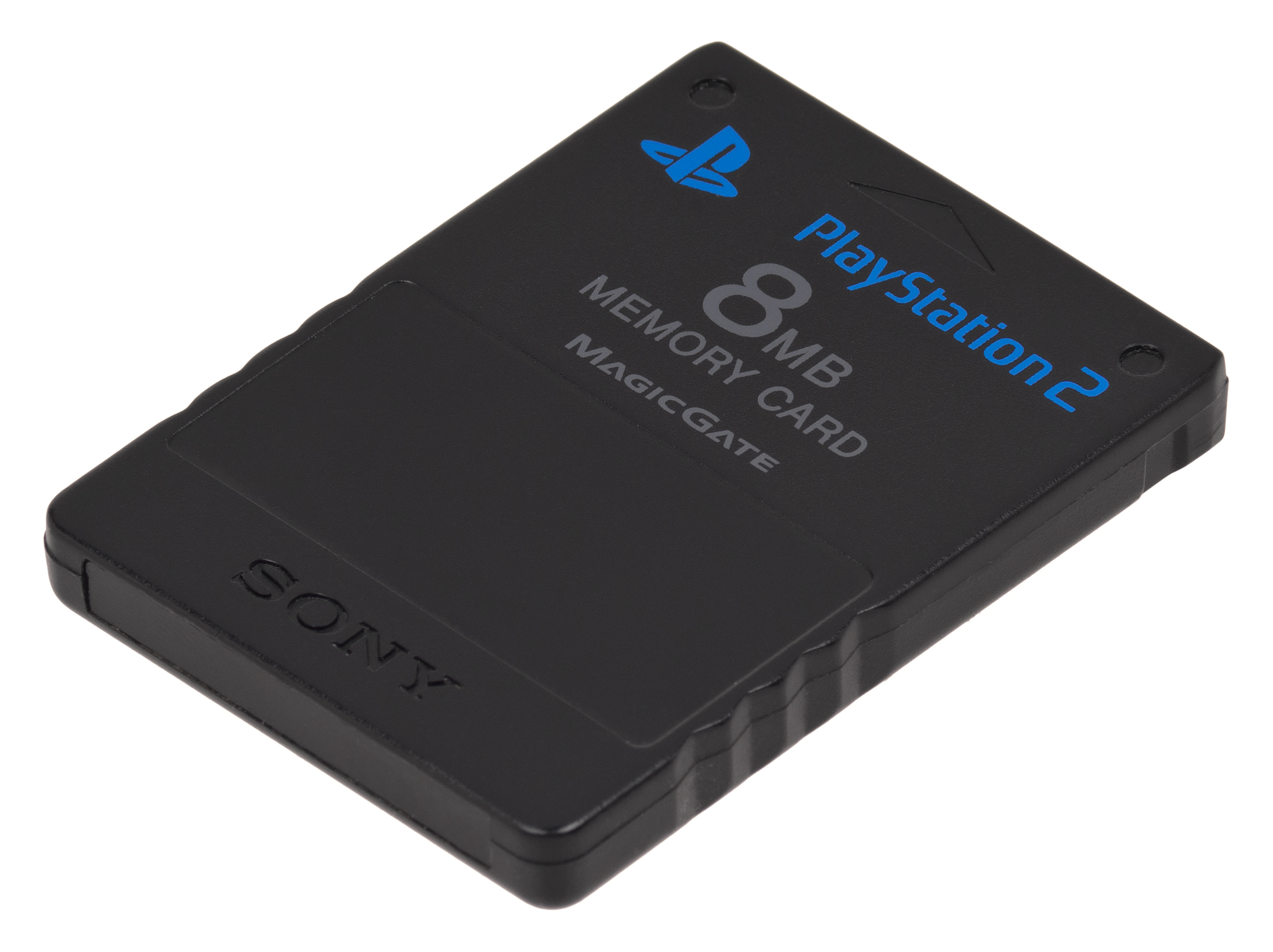
Official PS2 Memory Card (8 MB)

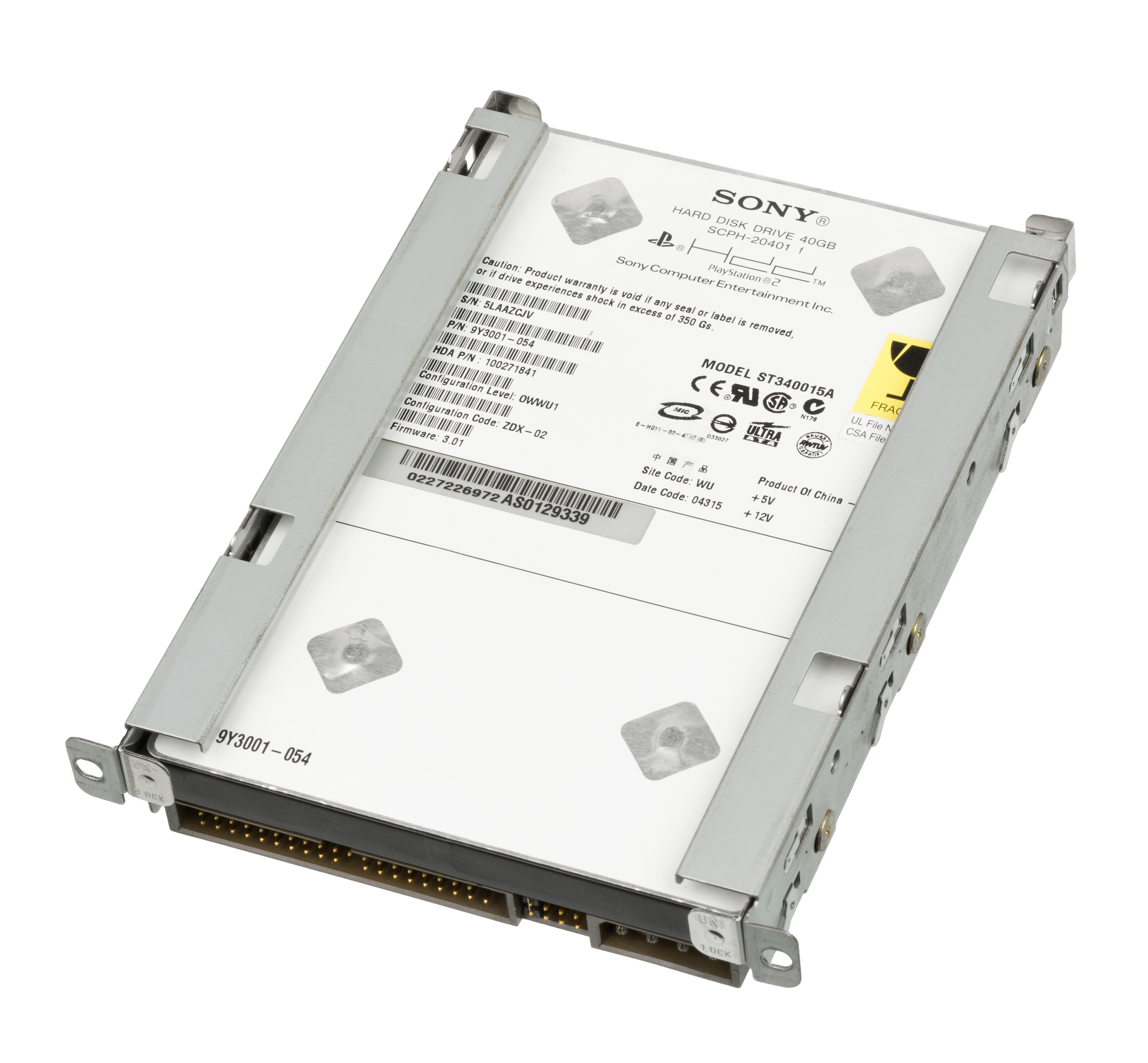
Official PS2 Hard Disk Drive (40 GB)

- Storage media:
  - 8 MB memory card for saved games and data transfer
    - Uses MagicGate encryption
    - Read speeds of up to 130 KB/s
    - Capacities of up to 128 MB or 256 MB (2x 128 MB) for some third-party memory cards
  - Optional 40 GB hard disk drive (requires Network Adaptor)

== Optical disc drive ==
- Disc Drive type: proprietary interface through a custom micro-controller + DSP chip. 24x speed CD-ROM [3.6 MB/s], 4x speed DVD-ROM [5.28 MB/s] — region-locked with copy protection.
- Supported Disc Media: PlayStation 2 format CD-ROM, PlayStation format CD-ROM, CD-DA, PlayStation 2 format DVD-ROM, DVD Video. DVD5 (Single-layer, 4.7 GB) and DVD9 (Dual-layer, 8.5 GB) supported. Later models starting with SCPH-500xx are DVD+RW and DVD-RW compatible.

== Connectivity ==
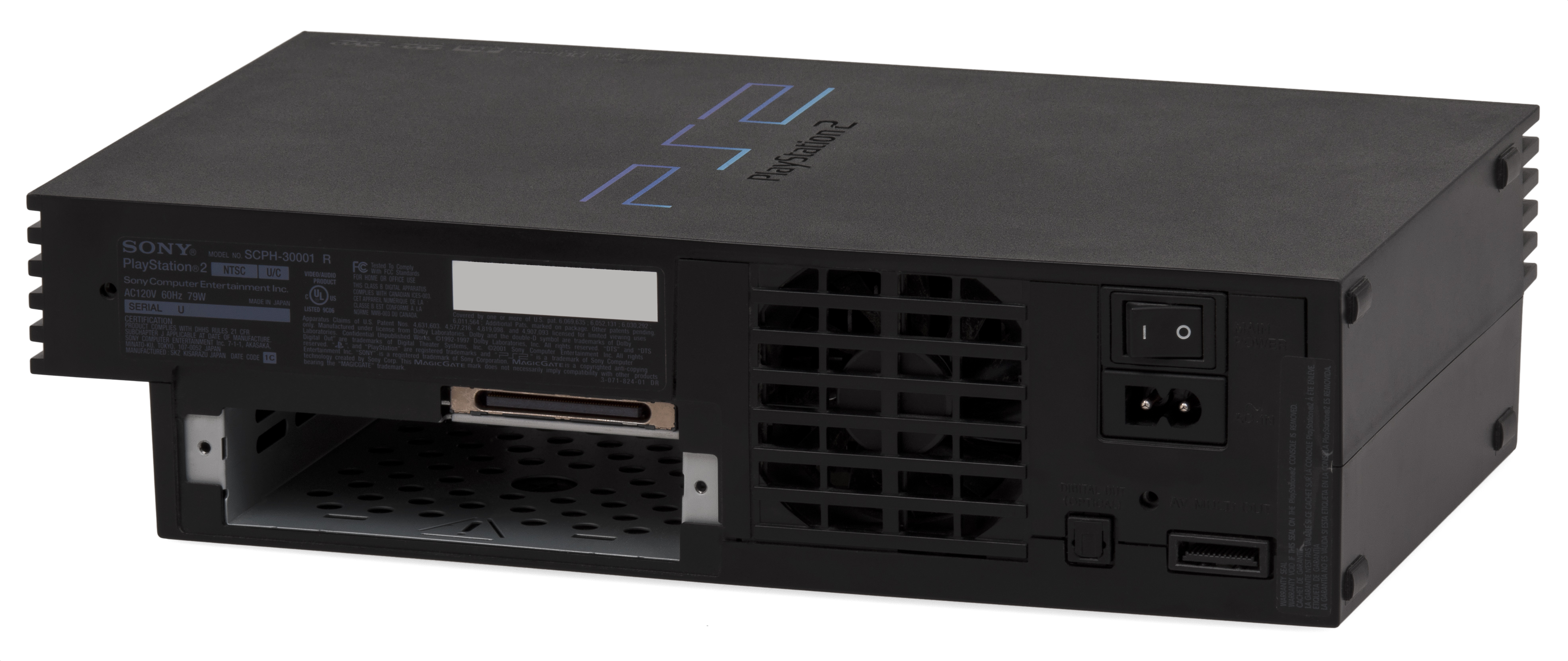
Back of an SCPH-30001 model PlayStation 2, featuring a power switch, power connector and various input/output ports; the expansion bay has its cover removed

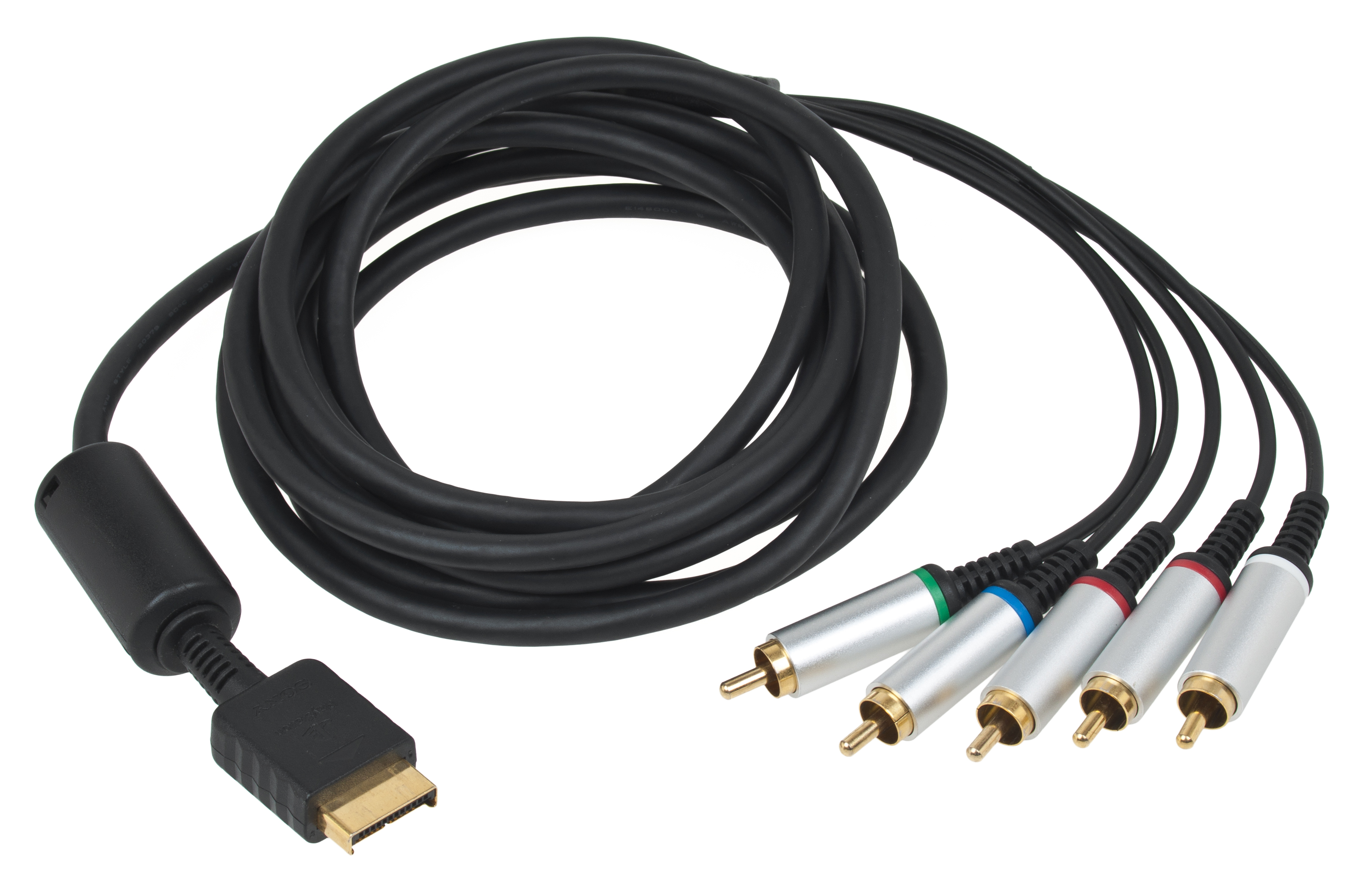
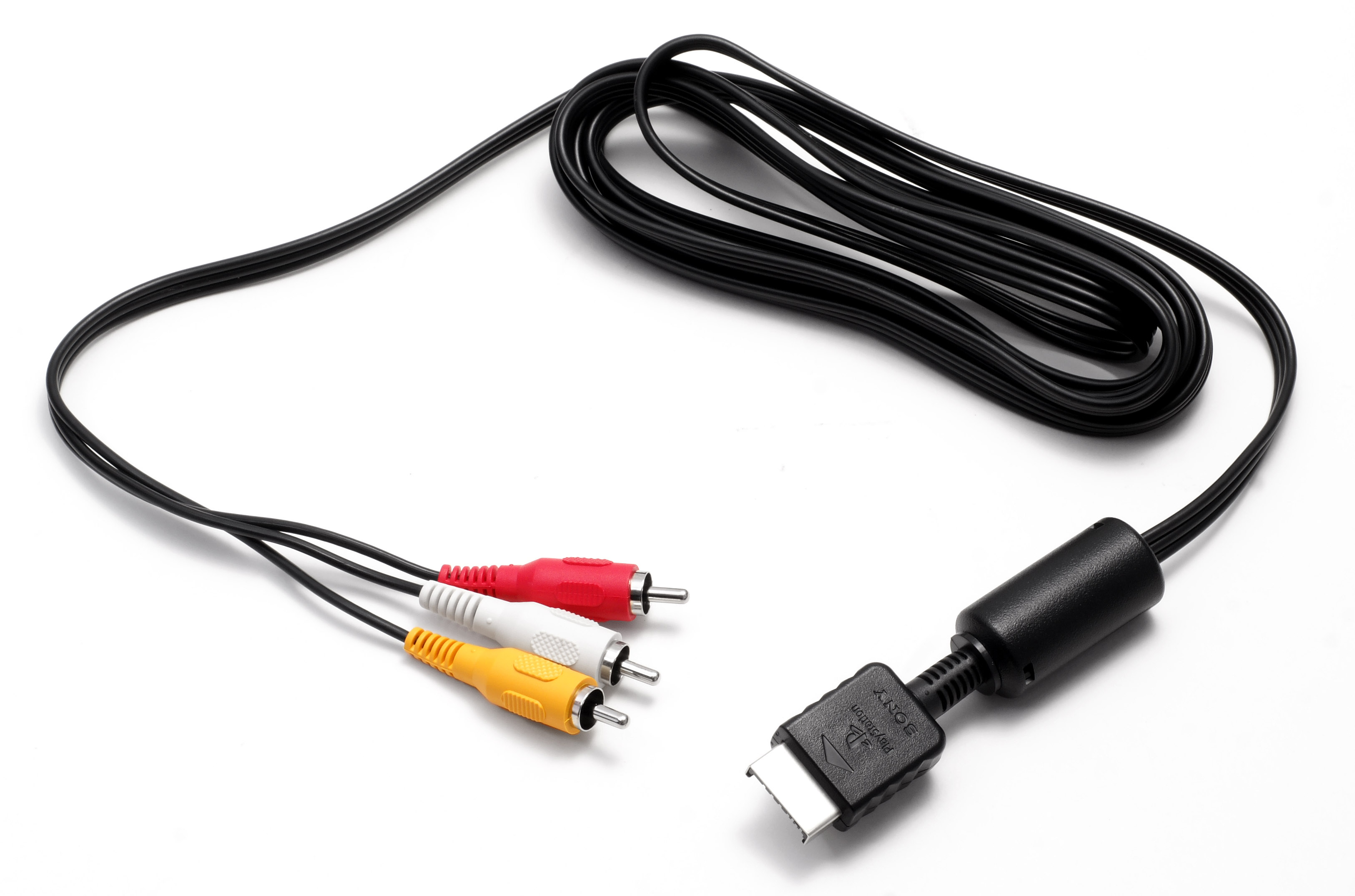
PlayStation component (YP_{B}P_{R}) (left) and A/V (composite video/stereo audio) (right) cables
- 2 proprietary PlayStation controller ports (250 kHz clock for PS1 and 500 kHz for PS2 controllers)
- 2 proprietary Memory Card slots using MagicGate encryption (250 kHz for PS1 cards. Up to 2 MHz for PS2 cards with an average sequential read speed of 130 KB/s)
- 2 USB 1.1 ports with an OHCI-compatible controller
- AV Multi Out (Composite video, S-Video, RGBS^{†} (SCART), RGsB (SCART or VGA connector^{††}), YP_{B}P_{R}^{†††} (component or D-Terminal))
- RFU DC Out
- S/PDIF Digital Out
- PC Card slot for Network Adaptor (PC Card type) and external HDD (SCPH-10000, SCPH-15000, SCPH-18000 only)
- Expansion Bay for 3.5-inch HDD and Network Adaptor (required for HDD; SCPH-300xx to 500xx only)
- Emotion Engine (EE) includes an on-chip Serial I/O port (SIO) used internally by the EE's kernel to output debugging and messages and to start the kernel debugger.
- Ethernet port (Network Adaptor and Slim only)
- Phone-line modem port (Network Adaptor and Slim only, some models)
- i.LINK S400 (also known as FireWire 400 or IEEE 1394a) (SCPH-10000 to 3900x only)
- Infrared remote control port (SCPH-500xx and newer)

^† Standard RGB mode only allows interlaced modes up to 480i (NTSC) and 576i (PAL) and progressive modes up to 240p. A display or adapter capable of sync on green (RGsB) is necessary for higher modes. Furthermore, the PS2's Macrovision copy protection isn't compatible with either RGB mode, and thus DVDs cannot be played with RGB. However, motherboard modifications have been known to bypass these issues.
^†† VGA connector is only available for progressive-scan supported games, homebrew-enabled systems, and Linux for PlayStation 2, and requires a monitor that supports RGsB, or "sync on green" signals.
^††† Contrary to popular belief, the PS2's YP_{B}P_{R}/component output does fully support 240p outputs, including games from the original PlayStation. However, 240p isn't part of the YP_{B}P_{R} standard, and thus not all TVs and HDTVs support it. Upscaling can be used as a workaround.

== See also ==
- PlayStation technical specifications
- PlayStation 3 technical specifications
- PlayStation 4 technical specifications
