= PlayStation technical specifications =

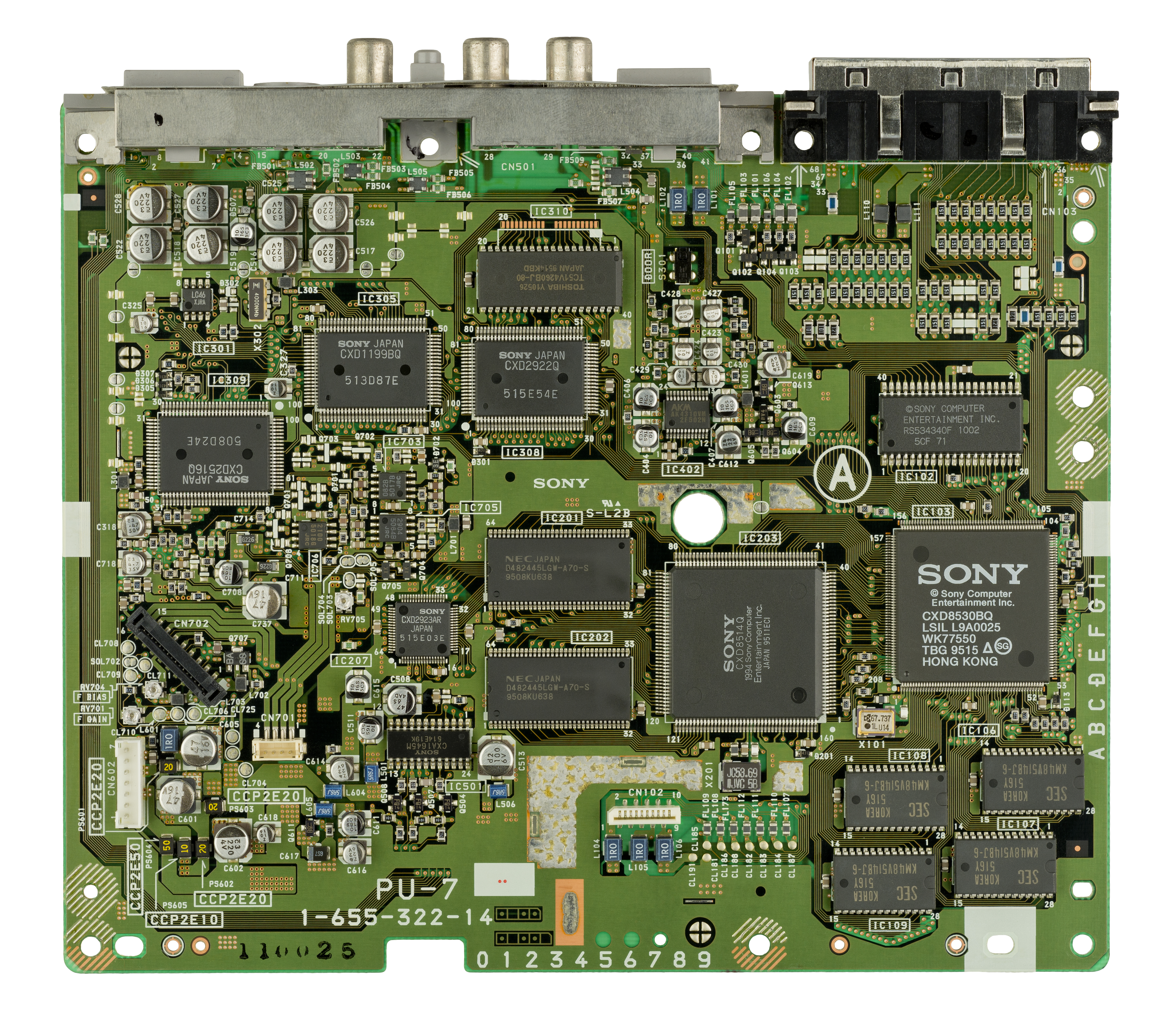
An SCPH-1000 motherboard

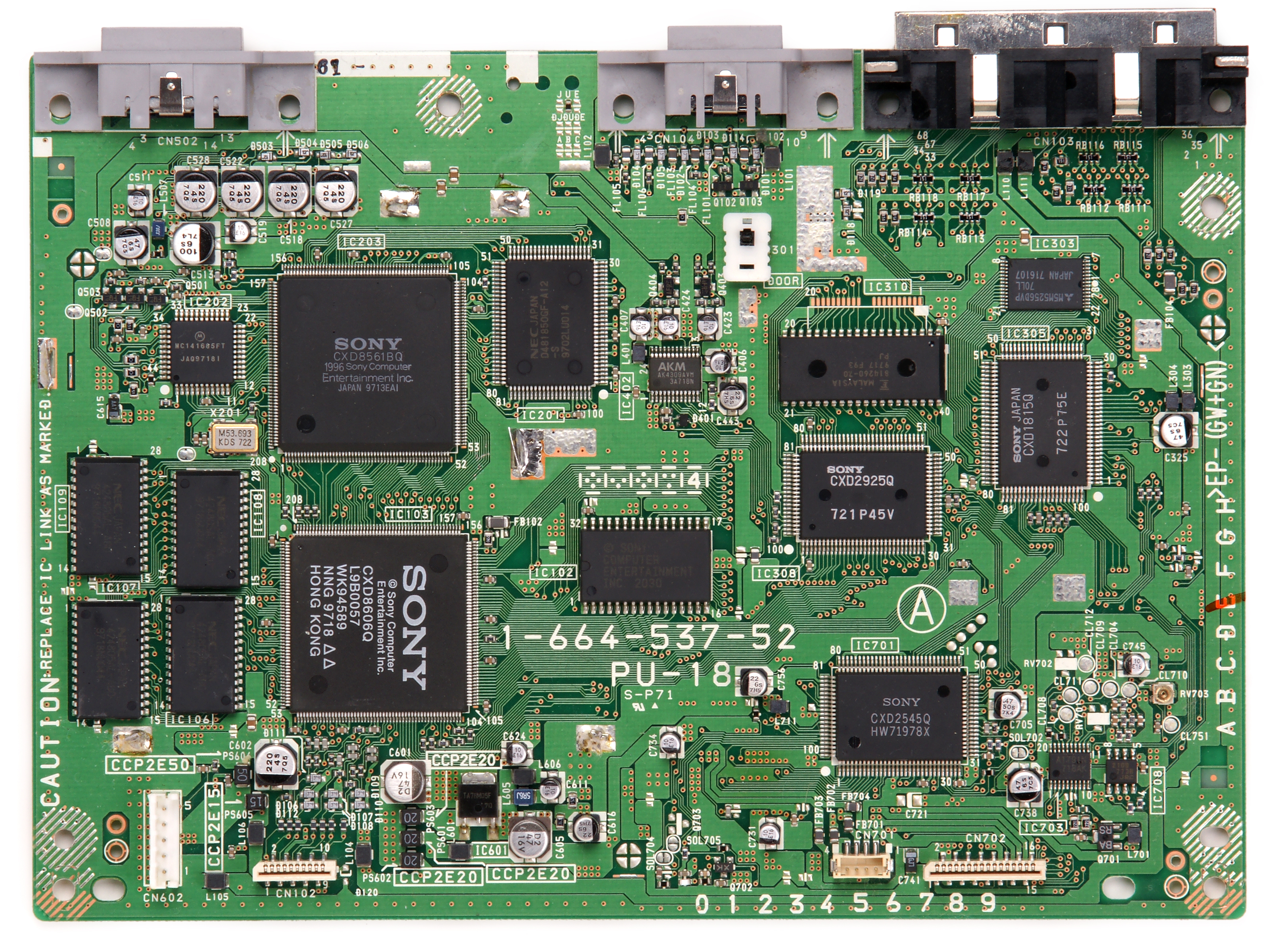
An SCPH-5001 motherboard

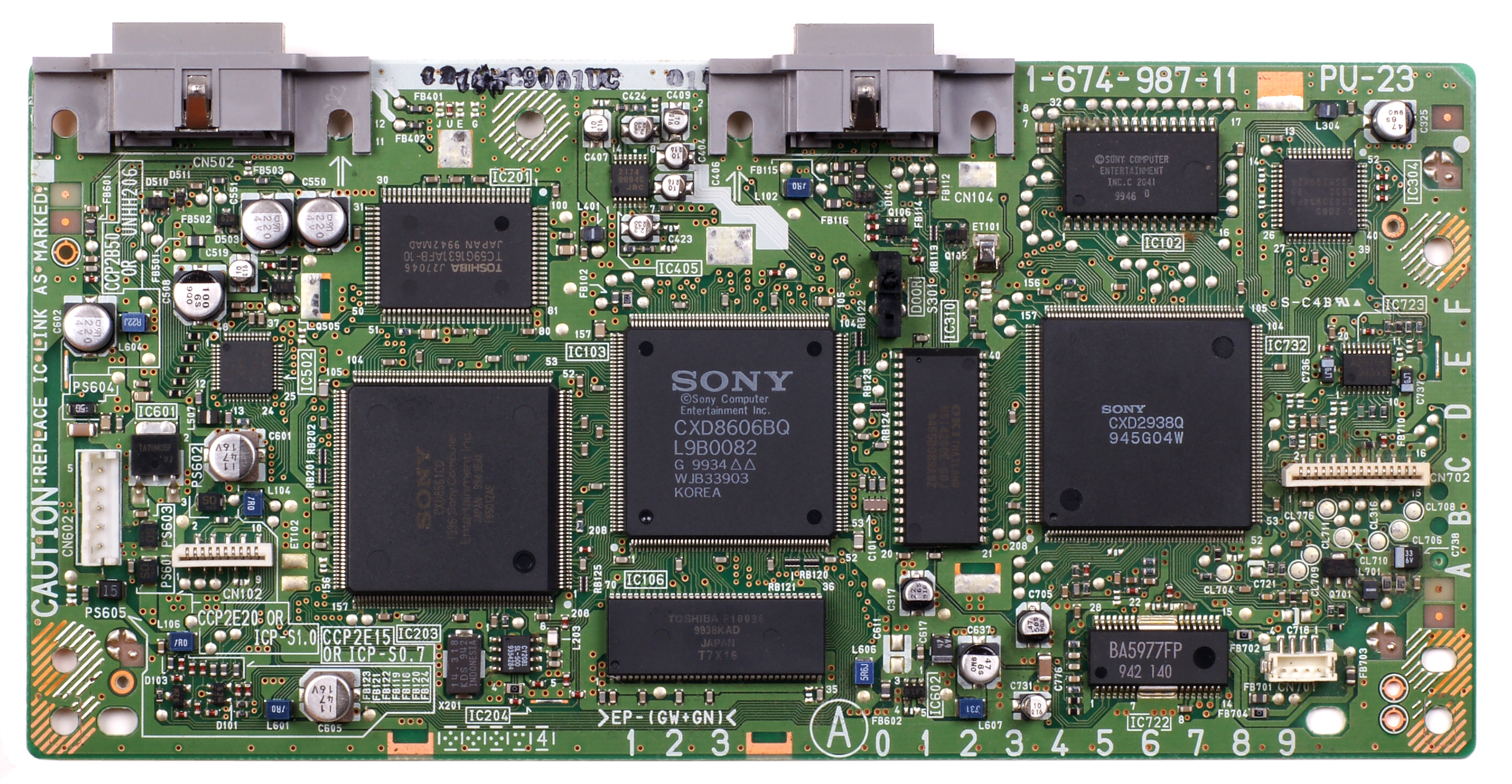
An SCPH-9001 motherboard

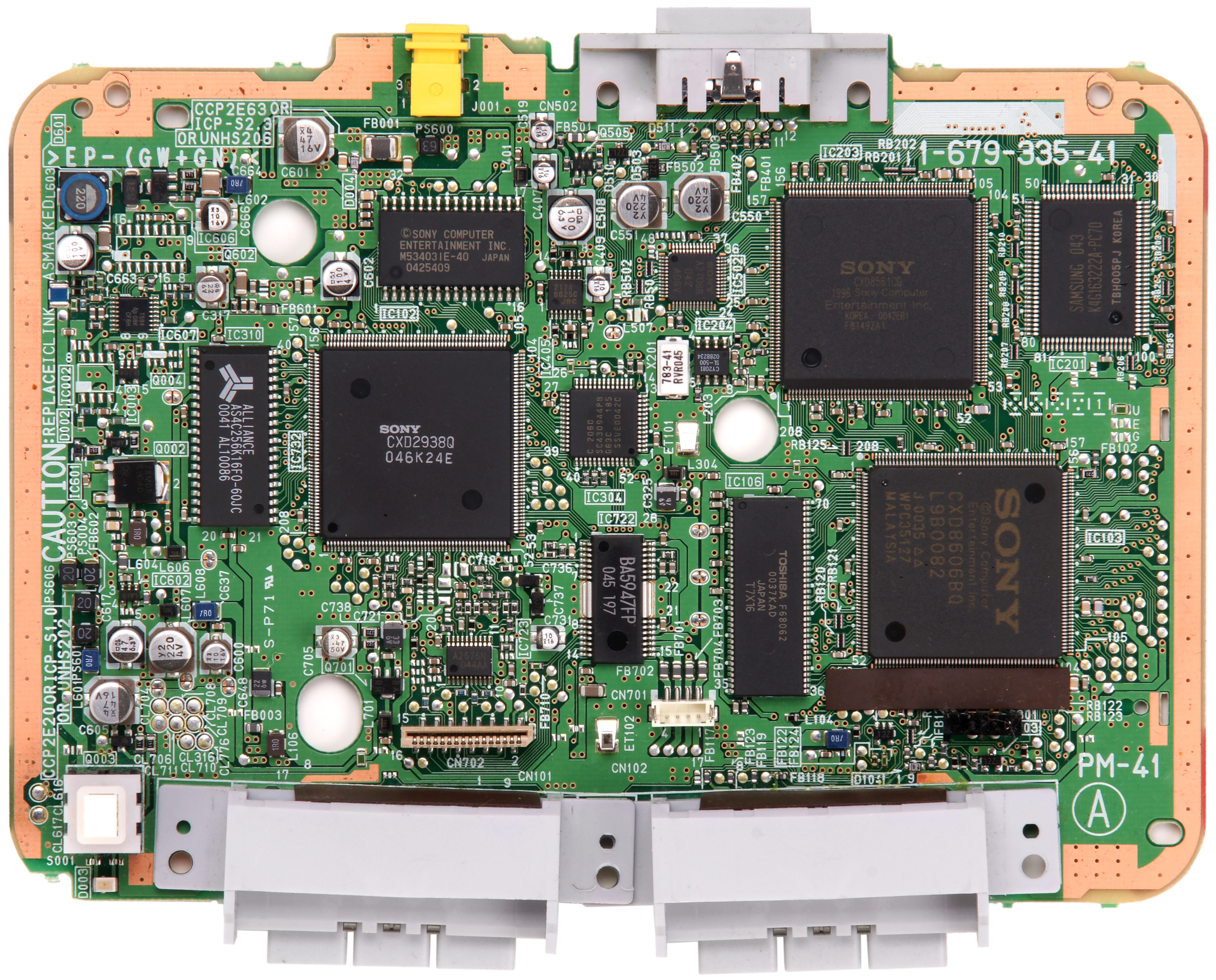
An SCPH-101 motherboard

The PlayStation technical specifications describe the various components of the original PlayStation video game console.

== Central processing unit (CPU) ==
LSI CoreWare CW33000-based core

- MIPS R3000A-compatible 32-bit RISC CPU MIPS R3051 with 5 KB L1 cache, running at 33.8688 MHz.
- The microprocessor was manufactured by LSI Logic Corp. with technology licensed from SGI.
- Features:
  - Initial feature size (process node) was 0.5 micron (500 nm).
  - 850k – 1M transistors
  - Operating performance: 30 MIPS
  - Bus bandwidth 132 MB/s
  - One arithmetic/logic unit (ALU)
  - One shifter
- CPU cache RAM:
  - 4 KB instruction cache
  - 1 KB data cache configured as a scratchpad

Geometry Transformation Engine (GTE)

- Coprocessor that resides inside the main CPU processor, giving it additional vector math instructions used for 3D graphics, lighting, geometry, polygon and coordinate transformations – GTE performs high-speed matrix multiplications.
- Operating performance: 66 MIPS
- Uses fixed point arithmetic, different operations used different representations
- Polygons per second (rendered in hardware):
  - 90,000 with texture mapping, lighting and Gouraud shading
  - 180,000 with texture mapping
  - 360,000 with flat shading

Motion Decoder (MDEC)

- Also residing within the main CPU, enables full screen, high quality FMV playback and is responsible for decompressing images and video into VRAM.
- Operating performance: 80 MIPS
- Documented device mode is to read three RLE-encoded 16×16 macroblocks, run IDCT and assemble a single 16×16 RGB macroblock.
- Output data may be transferred directly to GPU via DMA.
- It is possible to overwrite IDCT matrix and some additional parameters, however MDEC internal instruction set was never documented.
- It is directly connected to a CPU bus.

System Control Coprocessor (Cop0)

- This unit is part of the CPU. Has 16 32-bit control registers.
- Modified from the original R3000A cop0 architecture, with the addition of a few registers and functions.
- Controls memory management through virtual memory technique, system interrupts, exception handling, and breakpoints.

== Memory ==
- 2 MiB main EDO DRAM
- Additional RAM is integrated with the GPU (including a 1 MB framebuffer) and SPU (512 KB), see below for details.
- Cache RAM for CPU core and CD-ROM. See the relevant sections for details.
- Flash RAM support through the use of memory cards, see below.
- BIOS stored on 512 KB ROM

== Graphics processing unit (GPU) ==
32-bit Sony GPU (designed by Toshiba)

- Handles display of graphics, control of framebuffer, and drawing of polygons and textures
- Handles 2D graphics processing, in a similar manner to the 3D engine
- RAM:
  - 1 MB VRAM (later models contained SGRAM) for framebuffer
  - 2 KB texture cache (132 MB/s memory bus bandwidth, 32-bit wide)
  - 64 bytes FIFO buffer
- Features:
  - Adjustable framebuffer (1024×512)
  - Emulation of simultaneous backgrounds (to simulate parallax scrolling)
  - Mask bit
  - Texture window
  - Dithering
  - Clipping
  - Alpha blending (4 per-texel alpha blending modes)
  - Fog
  - Framebuffer effects
  - Transparency effects
  - Render to texture
  - Offscreen rendering
  - Multipass rendering
  - Flat or Gouraud shading and texture mapping
  - No line restriction
  - Colored light sourcing
- Resolutions:
  - Progressive: 256×224 to 640×240 pixels
  - Interlaced: 256×448 to 640×512 pixels
- Acceptable video modes: 15kHz, 24kHz, 31kHz
- Colors:
  - Maximum color depth of 16,777,216 colors (24-bit true color)
  - 57,344 (256×224) to 153,600 (640×240) colors on screen
  - Unlimited color lookup tables (CLUTs)
  - 32 levels of transparency
  - All calculations are performed to 24 bit accuracy
- Texture mapping color mode:
  - Mode 4: 4-bit CLUT (16 colors)
  - Mode 8: 8-bit CLUT (256 colors)
  - Mode 15: 15-bit direct (32,768 colors)
  - Mode 24: 24-bit (16,777,216 colors)
- Sprite engine
  - 1024×512 framebuffer, 8×8 and 16×16 sprite sizes, bitmap objects
  - Up to 4,000 sprites on screen (at 8×8 sprite size), scaling and rotation
  - 256×256 maximum sprite size
- Special sprite effects:
  - Rotation
  - Scaling up/down
  - Warping
  - Transparency
  - Fading
  - Priority
  - Vertical and horizontal line scroll
- Pixel fillrate (theoretical maximum):
  - 66 MPixel/s flat shaded polygons
  - 33 MPixel/s Gouraud shaded polygons
  - 33 MPixel/s for textured polygons with optional Gourard shading
  - Actual fill rate is lower due to polygon overhead or texture cache misses

== Sound processing unit (SPU) ==
16-bit Sony SPU

- Supports ADPCM sources with up to 24 channels
- Sampling rate of up to 44.1 kHz
- 512 KB RAM
- PCM audio source
- Supports MIDI sequencing
- Digital effects include:
  - Pitch modulation
  - Envelope
  - Looping
  - Digital reverb

== I/O system and connectivity ==
CD-ROM drive

- 660 MB maximum storage capacity, double speed (CLV) CD-ROM drive
- 2×, with a maximum data throughput of 300 KB/s (double speed), 150 KB/s (normal)
- 32 KB data buffer
- XA Mode 2 compliant
- Audio CD play
- CD-DA (CD-Digital Audio)
- Rated for 70,000 seek operations

Two control pads via connectors

- Expandable with multitap connector

Backup flash RAM support

- Two removable cards
- Each card has 128 KB flash memory
- OS support for File Save, Retrieve and Remove
- Some games (like "Music 2000") can use Memory Cards as main RAM, to store data for real time processing, bypassing the 2MB RAM limit.

Video and audio connectivity

- AV Multi Out (Composite video, S-Video, RGBS)
- RCA Composite video and Stereo out (SCPH-100x to 5000 only)
- RFU (SCPH-112X) DC out (SCPH-100x to 5000 only)
- S-Video out (SCPH-1000 only)

Serial and parallel ports

- Serial I/O (used for PlayStation Link Cable SCPH-100x to 900x only)
- Parallel I/O (N/A) SCPH-100x to 750x only)

Power input

- 100 V AC (NTSC-J); 120 V AC (NTSC-U/C); or 220–240 V AC (PAL); or 100–240 V AC (Secret Fat)
- 7.5 V DC 2 A (PSone only); or 7.5−14 V DC 1−4 A (Secret Slim)

== See also ==
- PlayStation 2 technical specifications
- PlayStation 3 technical specifications
- PlayStation 4 technical specifications
