= PlayStation 4 technical specifications =

The PlayStation 4 technical specifications describe the various hardware components of the PlayStation 4 home video game console group. Multiple versions of this console have been released since the initial launch of the PlayStation 4, including the PlayStation 4 Slim and the PlayStation 4 Pro. Subsequent versions include changes to the technical specifications of the console.

== Versions ==
The original released 420 GB HDD PS4s had manufacturer serial numbers of the form CUH-10XXA; a minor modification with a different form of Wi-Fi Microstrip antenna was registered in mid 2014 as part numbers CUH-11XXA.

In 2015, the CUH-12 series as variants CUH-1215A and CUH-1215B (with 500 GB and 1 TB storage respectively) were certified in the US by the FCC. Differences between the CUH-11 and CUH-12 series included a reduction in rated power from 250 W to 230 W, a reduction in weight from 2.8 to 2.5 kg, and physical buttons. The CUH-12xx series are also referred to as the "C chassis" variant of the PS4.

In late June 2015, a 1 TB CUH-11 series machine was announced for European/PAL markets.

The CUH-1200 series was officially announced in June 2015, releasing first in Japan, then worldwide. Changes to the design included a matte black HDD cover replacing the original gloss black version. Other minor changes to the design included mechanical buttons replacing electrostatic touch sensitive ones, and a shorter but brighter LED indicator on the top surface of the console. Internally the CUH-12 series included a number of minor changes, including the change to 8 memory modules of 1 GB (from a previous 16 modules of 512 MB).

At a PlayStation official event in New York (USA) in September 2016 Sony officially announced a new redesigned PS4, the CUH-2000 series, (known colloquially as the "PS4 slim") for sale from 15 Sep at $299, €299, £259, or 29,980 Yen for the base 500 GB model. According to a Sony press release the new model (CUH-2000) was 16% lighter and used 28% less energy than the CUH-1200 series. A 1 TB model at 34,980 Yen was also announced. At the same event a more powerful variant, named the "PS4 Pro" was also announced, designed for 4K and HDR displays. Earlier PS4 models received HDR support with System Software 4.00.

=== PlayStation 4 Pro ===
Die shot of the AMD 16nm Jaguar Polaris APU used in the PS4 Pro

The upgraded PS4 Pro (originally codenamed 'Neo', product code CUH-7000) used a more powerful APU built with a 16 nm FinFET process from TSMC. While the number of logical processor cores (8) was unchanged, its CPU clock speed increased from 1.6 GHz to 2.13 GHz (a 33.1% improvement in CPU core clock rate), but with the underlying architecture unchanged. The number of graphics Compute Units on the APU doubled to 36 Graphics Core Next (GCN) Compute Units (from 18), with a clock speed increase to 911 MHz (from 800 MHz), resulting in a theoretical single precision floating point performance metric of 4.19 TeraFLOPs. Compared to the original PS4 GPU, this is a 2.2775× or 127.75% increase in single precision FLOPs. Improvements in GPU 16-bit variable float calculations derived from the newer AMD Vega architecture result in the PS4 Pro having a theoretical half precision floating point performance of 8.39 TeraFLOPs.

Overall unified system memory architecture was improved, with the addition of another 1 GB segment of DDR3 DRAM. The PS4 Pro could use this increase in memory to swap out non-gaming applications that run in the background, like Netflix and Spotify. As a side benefit to this, an additional 512 MB of GDDR5 was available for developers to use for games adding up to 5.5 GB, as opposed to the 5 GB available on base PS4 hardware. GDDR5 memory speed was increased from 5.5 Gbit/s (or 4× 1.375 GHz) to 6.8 Gbit/s (or 4× 1.7 GHz), increasing total memory bandwidth to 217.6 GB/s which correlates to a 23.8% improvement.

Some elements added to the design were derived from AMD's newer Polaris and newer architectures; such new features of the processor included a HEVC video codec supporting up to 4k resolution. Other specification changes included HDMI output being upgraded to HDMI 2.0b standard, with HDCP 2.2 compliance. Wireless networking includes 5 GHz band support using the IEEE 802.11ac standard, and Bluetooth support was upgraded to version 4.0; wired LAN is as the original PS4. The rated power of the original PS4 Pro is 310 W. The decision not to upgrade was predicated primarily on cost.

A limited translucent-case version of the PS4 Pro was released in August 2018, which includes minor hardware updates. This new system, model number CUH-7100, besides offering a larger hard drive, used a quieter fan. It drew power more consistently than the CUH-7000, though it became slightly hotter than the launch system.

A second minor hardware refresh, with model number CUH-7200, was first released in bundles with Red Dead Redemption 2 in November 2018. The newer version, otherwise functionally equivalent to the CUH-7000, has a different power connector, and used a quieter fan, which, according to Digital Foundry, made a "night and day" difference in the noise level, similar to the improvements in the CUH-7100. It drew power consistently at 170 W, whereas the 7000, while rated at 170 W, has brief spikes up to 177 W. However, the newer console fan ran slightly slower and became slightly hotter than the 7000 model to gain this improvement. The CUH-7000 model can achieve a similar noise level to the CUH-7200 model when its CPU's thermal paste is replaced and its heatsink and fan are cleaned. When it is done carefully and correctly, the procedure has low to medium risk and takes between fifteen minutes and two hours depending on one's skill and familiarity with the console.

== Processors and memory ==
"[We] have not built an APU quite like that for anyone else in the market. It is by far the most powerful APU we have built to date".

— John Taylor, AMD

The PlayStation 4 uses a semi-custom Accelerated Processing Unit (APU) developed by AMD in cooperation with Sony and is manufactured by TSMC on a 28 nm process node. Its APU is a single-chip that combines a central processing unit (CPU) and graphics processing unit (GPU), as well as other components such as a memory controller and video decoder/encoder. The console also includes secondary custom chips that handle tasks associated with downloading, uploading, and social gameplay. These tasks can be handled seamlessly in the background during gameplay or while the system is in rest mode.

Though not much is publicly known of the PS4's audio capabilities, the console also contains a dedicated hardware audio module, which can support in-game chat with minimal external resources as well as "a very large number" of MP3 streams for use in in-game audio.

=== APU ===
The main APU (2013 release) has a die size of 19 by 18.3 mm (0.75 by 0.72 in), with GPUs, CPUs and memory controllers on the same die. The 2013 release version APUs contained 20 GCN compute units on die, two of which are thought to be present to provide redundancy to improve manufacturing yield. CPUs plus CPU caches make up approximately 15% of the chip area, and the GPU compute units take up approximately 33% of the 348 mm^{2} (0.539 sq in) die area.

Device	CPU					GPU						Memory (GDDR5)				Special features
Device	μArch	Cores	Frequency	L2 cache	GFLOPS	μArch	Cores (Note: Unified shaders : texture mapping unit : render output unit)	Frequency	GFLOPS	Pixel fillrate (GP/s) (Note: Pixel fillrate is calculated as the number of ROPs multiplied by the base core clock speed.)	Texture fillrate (GT/s) (Note: Texture fillrate is calculated as the number of TMUs multiplied by the base core clock speed.)	Amount (GB)	Bus width (bit)	Bus type	Bandwidth (GB/s)	Special features
PS4	Jaguar	Two quad-core modules	1.6 GHz	2 × 2 MB	102.4	GCN 2nd	1152:72:32 (18 CUs) (enabled out of a total of 1280 SMs or 20 CUs)	800 MHz	1843.2	25.6	57.6	8 GB	256	GDDR5	176.0	8 ACEs in the GPU and additional modules
PS4 Pro	Jaguar	Two quad-core modules	2.13 GHz	2 × 2 MB	134.4	GCN 4th	2304:144:32 (36 CUs) (enabled out of a total of 2560 SMs or 40 CUs)	911 MHz	4197.8	29.15	131.2	8 GB	256	GDDR5	217.6	1 GB of DDR3 RAM for OS and swapping

==== Central processing units ====
The central processing unit (CPU) consists of two x86-64 quad-core modules for a total of eight cores, which are based on the Jaguar CPU architecture from AMD. Each core has 32 kB L1 instruction and data caches, with one shared 2 MB L2 cache per four-core module. The CPU's base clock speed is said to be 1.6 GHz. That produces a theoretical peak performance of 102.4 SP GFLOPS.

==== Graphics processing unit ====
GPU specifications:

- 1152 stream processors
- 72 texture mapping units
- 32 raster operators
- 18 compute units
- 8 asynchronous compute units (64 queues)
- 1.843 teraFLOPs

The graphics processing unit (GPU) is AMD's GPGPU-capable Radeon GCN architecture, consisting of 18 compute units (CUs) for a total of 1,152 cores (64 cores per CU), that produces a theoretical peak performance of 1.84 TFLOPS. This processing power can be used for graphics, physics simulation, or a combination of the two, or any other tasks suited for general purpose computing. The GPU is mostly based on the Bonaire architecture using GCN 1.1 technology. The PS4 GPU does not have any VRAM, because it uses system RAM for graphics operations.

Though based on AMD's GCN architecture, there are several known differentiating factors between the PS4's GPU and current-gen PC graphics cards featuring first-gen GCN architecture:

- An additional dedicated 20 GB/s bus that bypasses L1 and L2 GPU cache for direct system memory access, reducing synchronisation challenges when performing fine-grained GPGPU compute tasks.
- L2 cache support for simultaneous graphical and asynchronous compute tasks through the addition of a 'volatile' bit tag, providing control over cache invalidation, and reducing the impact of simultaneous graphical and general purpose compute operations.
- An upgrade from 2 to 64 sources for compute commands, improving compute parallelism and execution priority control. This enables finer-grain control over load-balancing of compute commands enabling superior integration with existing game engines.

==== Audio processing unit ====
Sharing the die with the rest of the components of the APU is a Digital signal processing SIP block that is either identical to AMD TrueAudio or shares a certain amount of similarity with it.

==== Memory controller ====
The rest of the microchip consists of the on-die memory controller, which is shared by the CPU and the GPU and some additional logic concerned with memory access. With AMD being a founding member of and Sony a contributor to the HSA Foundation, the uncore of the PlayStation 4 supports several of the features promoted by the Heterogeneous System Architecture like e.g. hUMA (heterogeneous Uniform Memory Access). This means the system memory is not partitioned, so that a portion of it is exclusively available to the GPU, but unified, hence enabling hardware zero-copy.

===== System memory (RAM) =====
The PS4 contains a total of 8 GB (16 × 0.5 GB (512 MiB) for CUH10XX/CUH11XX models or 8 x 1 GB (1024 MiB) for CUH12XX models memory chips) of GDDR5 unified system memory, and is capable of running at a maximum clock frequency of 2.75 GHz (5500 MT/s) with a maximum bandwidth of 176 GB/s. This is 16 times the amount of total RAM found in the PS3 and was expected to give the console considerable longevity. The unified memory architecture allows the CPU and GPU to access a consolidated memory, removing the need for separate, dedicated memory pools.

=== Auxiliary processor ===
The PS4 includes a secondary ARM processor (with separate 256 MiB of RAM) to assist with background functions and OS features.

== Storage ==
=== Blu-ray disc ===
The read-only optical drive reads Blu-ray discs at 6× constant angular velocity for a maximum read speed of 27 MB/s – a significant upgrade from the PS3's 2× speeds that were capped at 9 MB/s. To further enhance optical drive performance, the PS4 features a hardware on-the-fly zlib decompression module (a special piece of hardware used to quickly decompress the data on the Blu-ray disc, which has been compressed to save space and bandwidth), allowing for greater effective bandwidth, whilst at the same time, the console continuously caches data onto its hard disk, even buffering unread data when a game is not actively accessing the optical drive, forming part of Sony's PlayGo strategy.

=== DVD ===
The read-only optical drive also reads DVDs. It does not read CDs.

=== Hard drive ===
The console includes a 2.5" 500 GB, 1 TB or 2 TB hard drive, which can be upgraded by the user. The non-upgraded models feature a SATA connection with a 3 Gbit/s transfer speed, while the upgraded PlayStation 4 Pro models support 6 Gbit/s transfer speeds.

=== Other ===
An additional 256 MB chip (using a 2 Gbit DDR3 SDRAM chip in the 2013 release) is fitted, thought to be used by the auxiliary processor. An additional 32 MB (256 Mbit) flash memory chip is also fitted.

System Software 4.50, which was introduced on March 9, 2017, enabled the use of external USB hard drives up to 8 TB for additional storage.

== Input and output ==
The PlayStation 4 features 802.11 b/g/n Wi-Fi connectivity, Ethernet (10BASE-T, 100BASE-TX and 1000BASE-T), Bluetooth 2.1, and two USB 3.0 ports. An auxiliary port is also included for connection to the PlayStation Camera, a motion detection digital camera device. A mono headset, which can be plugged into the DualShock 4, comes bundled with the system. Audio/video output options include HDMI and optical S/PDIF. The PlayStation 4 does not have an analog audio/video output (if the user does not count the DualShock 4's 3.5 mm audio jack). The PS4 Slim (CUH-2000 series) features IEEE 802.11 a/b/g/n/ac Wi-Fi, Bluetooth v4.0 and two USB 3.1 ports while the Pro (CUH-7000 series) features three USB 3.1 ports, IEEE 802.11 a/b/g/n/ac Wi-Fi and Bluetooth 4.0 (LE).

=== Hardware modules ===
Module Name	Purpose/capability	Ref.
AMD TrueAudio	This package of user-programmable audio DSPs offloads audio processing from the CPU. Possible effects include 3D audio effects, audio compression and decompression, reverberation, and voice stream processing.	
Upload/download	Capable of uploading and downloading data to the hard disk	
Video compression/decompression	Capable of encoding/decoding video formats on-the-fly. These modules are AMD's UVD for hardware video decoding and AMD's VCE for hardware video encoding, used for recording SharePlay videos in the background.	
Zlib decoder	Decoding of compressed data from the Blu-ray optical drive.	
Wi-Fi module	Marvell Wireless Avastar 88W8797 Wireless communication: IEEE 802.11 b/g/n, Bluetooth 2.1 (EDR). Skyworks 2614B 315BB.	
HDMI module	2.0a HDMI output (initially 1.4, updated HDMI controller via software update 4.0).	
Ethernet controller	Marvell Alaska 88EC060-NNB2 Ethernet 10/100/1000 support.	
USB controller	USB 3.0 support.	

== Power usage ==
Power usage (2013)
Standby mode	10 W
Standby mode (with download)	70 W
Idle on menu	89–91 W
Blu-ray	93–96 W
Netflix	93 W
Game installation	108–116 W
Gaming (Resogun)	130–139 W
Gaming (Killzone)	144–151 W

The PS4 is powered via an internal wide voltage range (110–240 V AC 50 Hz/60 Hz) switched-mode power supply. The originally released version had a maximum power rating of 250 W. According to tests by Eurogamer, initial consoles drew approximately 80 W when operational in menu mode, rising to around 110–120 W in gameplay, with peaks of 140 W with both gameplay and menus active, tests by the Natural Resources Defense Council showed similar power consumption figures with 137 W gameplay peaks (with PS4 Camera connected); power consumption in (internet-connected) standby mode was measured at 8.8 W under the same conditions, with a lower power "off" state drawing 0.5 W.

The PS4 cooling system uses a single centrifugal fan, which draws air in from both sides of the console, split into flows above and below the main PCB, before entering the fan from top and bottom; the fan exhaust then cools the main APU via a heat pipe-connected heatsink, with the exhaust passing over the main power supply before being emitted from the rear of the console.

The CUH-1200 model update (2015) power supply rating was reduced from 250 W to 230 W, with gameplay and standby download power usages reduced to around 82% of the previous version's values (148.6 to 122 W running Dragon Quest Heroes, 70 to 58 W in standby download mode).

The "PS4 slim" (official CUH-2000 series) released in September 2016 reduced the rating of the power supply to 165 W; according to Tweaktown the reduction in power requirements was due to the main APU being made at a 16 nm scale, down from 28 nm. Sony claimed power use reductions of 28% compared to the CUH-1200 series, and 34% compared to the original CUH-1000 series.

== See also ==
- PlayStation technical specifications
- PlayStation 2 technical specifications
- PlayStation 3 technical specifications
- PlayStation 5 § Hardware
- Xbox One § Hardware
