= PlayStation 3 technical specifications =

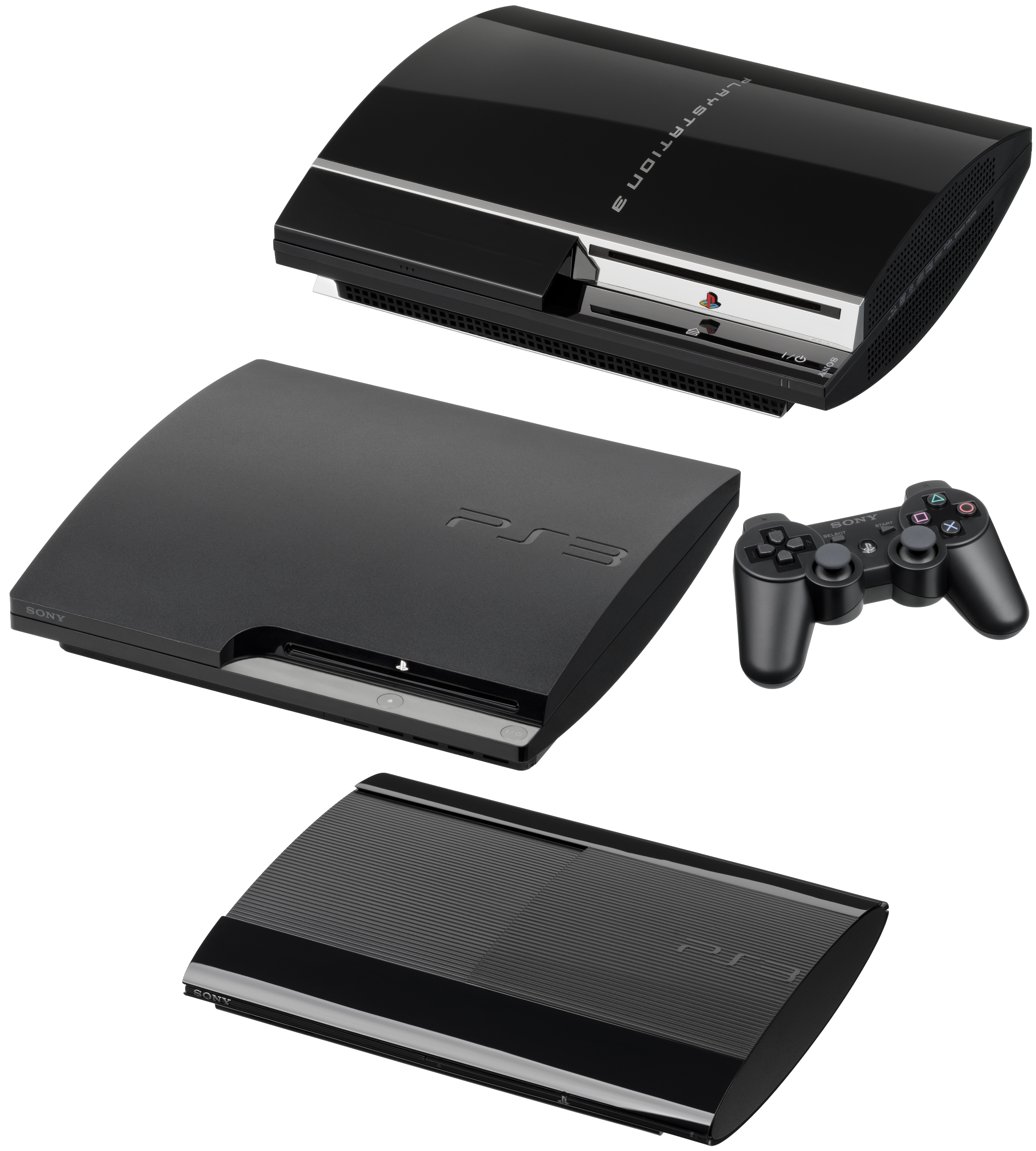
PS3 Regular, Slim and Super Slim with a DualShock 3 Controller

The PlayStation 3 technical specifications describe the various components of the PlayStation 3 (PS3) video game console.

== Central processing unit ==
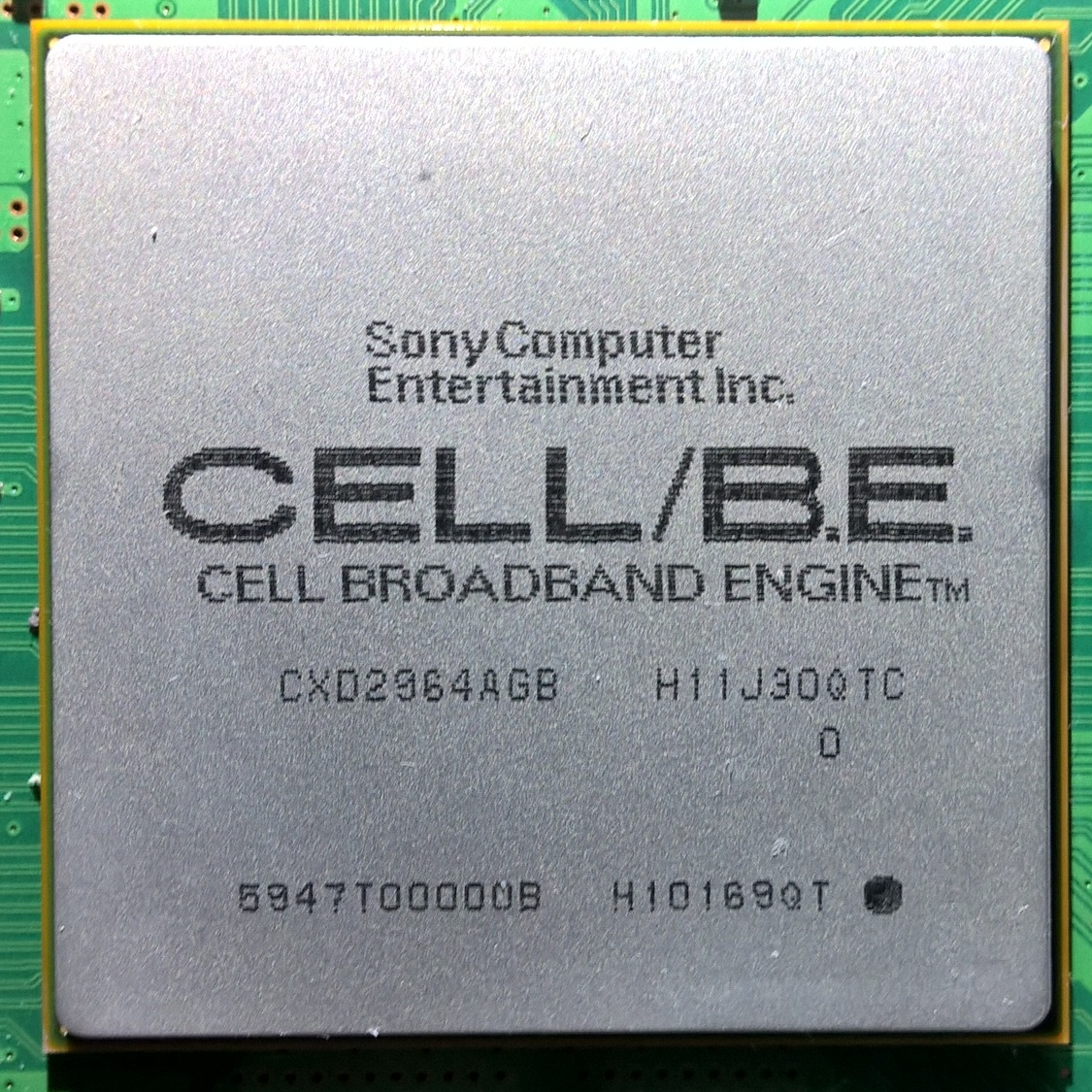
The Cell Broadband Engine on a PlayStation 3 motherboard

The PlayStation 3 is powered by the Cell Broadband Engine, a 64-bit CPU co-developed by Sony, Toshiba and IBM. It includes a 3.2 GHz PowerPC-based Power Processing Element (PPE) and seven Synergistic Processing Elements (SPEs). To improve manufacturing yield, the processor is initially fabricated with eight SPEs. After production, each chip is tested, and if a defect is found in one SPE, it is disabled using laser trimming. This approach minimizes waste by utilizing processors that would otherwise be discarded. Even in chips without defects, one SPE is intentionally disabled to ensure consistency across units. Of the seven operational SPEs, six are available for developers to use in games and applications, while the seventh is reserved for the console's operating system.

The Cell processor achieves a theoretical maximum of 204.8 GFLOPS in single precision floating point operations and up to 15 GFLOPS double precision.

The PS3 has 256 MB Rambus XDR DRAM, clocked at CPU die speed. The PPE has 64 KB L1 cache and 512 KB L2 cache, while the SPEs have 2 MB local memory (256 KB per SPE), connected by the Element Interconnect Bus (EIB) with up to 307.2 Gbit/s bandwidth.

The Cell processor was initially produced on a 90 nm process. It was shrunk to 65 nm in 2007, and to 45 nm in 2009.

== Graphics processing unit ==
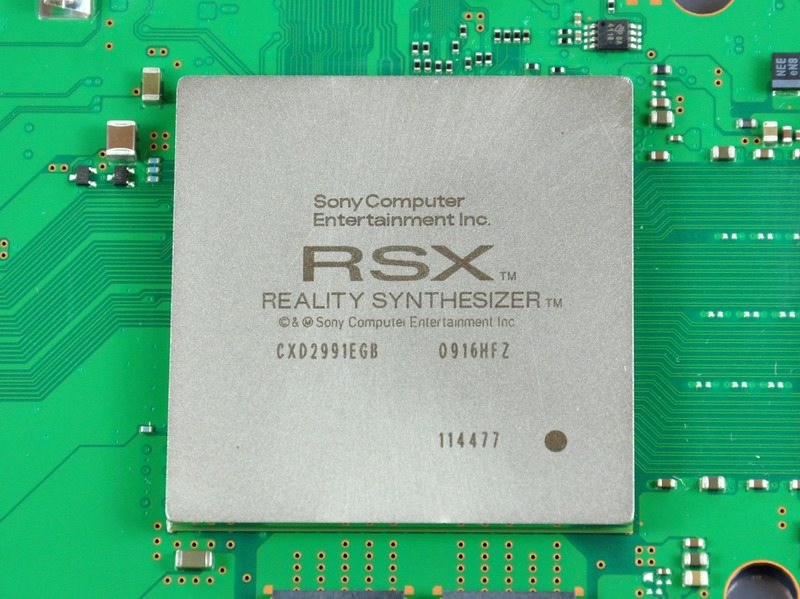
PS3 GPU-RSX "Reality Synthesizer"

Graphics processing for PlayStation 3 is managed by the RSX Reality Synthesizer, developed by Nvidia and paired with 256 MB of GDDR3 video memory. The RSX graphics processor can output resolutions ranging from standard-definition (480i/576i) up to high-definition (1080p).

The GPU is clocked at 500 MHz and makes use of 256 MB GDDR3 RAM clocked at 650 MHz with an effective transmission rate of 1.3 GHz. The RSX has a floating-point performance of 192 GFLOPS.

The RSX was initially fabricated on a 90 nm process. To help resolve reliability issues and to improve efficiency, it received a node shrink to 65 nm in 2008, to 40 nm in 2010, and to 28 nm in 2013.

== Configurations ==
The PS3 received several component revisions which served to reduce power consumption. This in turn resulted in production savings, lower heat production, lower cooling requirements and quieter operation. Since launch, the Cell processor shrank from 90 nm to 45 nm. The RSX GPU also saw reduction in size over periodic revisions of the PS3.

Major improvements were introduced with the PS3 Slim. It utilizes a 45 nm Cell which results in a 34% reduction in power consumption over the previous 65 nm Cell model; the last Slim model further decreases power consumption with the move to a 40 nm RSX and later 28 nm on the CECH‑43xx models.

Generation	Storage	Encoding	Model	CPU process	GPU process	PS2 compatibility	Front USB	Power supply
1st	60 GB	NTSC	CECHAxx	90 nm	90 nm	Yes, hardware-based	4+flash	380 W
1st	20 GB	NTSC	CECHBxx	90 nm	90 nm	Yes, hardware-based	4	380 W
2nd	60 GB	PAL	CECHCxx	90 nm	90 nm	Partial, software/hardware-based	4+flash	380 W
2nd	80 GB	NTSC	CECHExx	90 nm	90 nm	Partial, software/hardware-based	4+flash	380 W
3rd	40 GB	PAL, NTSC	CECHGxx; CECHHxx	65 nm	90 nm	No, some emulated games available for download	2	280 W
3rd	40 GB	PAL, NTSC	CECHJxx	65 nm	65 nm	No, some emulated games available for download	2	280 W
3rd	80 GB	PAL, NTSC	CECHKxx; CECHLxx; CECHMxx	65 nm	65 nm	No, some emulated games available for download	2	280 W
3rd	160 GB	PAL, NTSC	CECHPxx; CECHQxx	65 nm	65 nm	No, some emulated games available for download	2	280 W
4th "Slim"	120/250 GB	PAL, NTSC	CECH‑20xx	45 nm	65 nm	No, some emulated games available for download	2	250 W
4th "Slim"	120/250 GB	PAL, NTSC	CECH‑21xx	45 nm	40 nm	No, some emulated games available for download	2	230 W
4th "Slim"	160/320 GB	PAL, NTSC	CECH‑25xx	45 nm	40 nm	No, some emulated games available for download	2	230 W
4th "Slim"	160/320 GB	PAL, NTSC	CECH‑30xx	45 nm	40 nm	No, some emulated games available for download	2	200 W
5th "Super Slim"	12/250/500 GB	PAL, NTSC	CECH‑40xx	45 nm	40 nm	No, some emulated games available for download	2	190 W
5th "Super Slim"	12/250/500 GB	PAL, NTSC	CECH‑42xx	45 nm	40 nm	No, some emulated games available for download	2	190 W
5th "Super Slim"	12/250/500 GB	PAL, NTSC	CECH‑43xx	45 nm	28 nm	No, some emulated games available for download	2	190 W

=== Model numbers ===
On all models of the PS3, the last seven characters of the serial number make up the console's model number. This begins with "CECH", followed by a letter indicating what model the system is. The last two characters of the model number indicate what region the system is from.

Model	Capacity	Release	Regions										
Model	Capacity	Release	00 (JP)	01 (NA)	02 (AU)	03 (UK)	04 (EMEA)	05 (KOR)	06 (SEA)	07 (TW)	08 (RU/IN)	11 (SA)	12 (HK)
CECHAxx	60 GB	November 2006	Yes	Yes	—N/a	—N/a	—N/a	—N/a	Yes	Yes	—N/a	—N/a	Yes
CECHBxx	20 GB	November 2006	Yes	Yes	—N/a	—N/a	—N/a	—N/a	—N/a	Yes	—N/a	—N/a	Yes
CECHCxx	60 GB	March 2007	—N/a	—N/a	Yes	Yes	Yes	—N/a	—N/a	—N/a	Yes	—N/a	—N/a
CECHDxx	20 GB	Unreleased											
CECHExx	80 GB	August 2007	—N/a	Yes	—N/a	—N/a	—N/a	Yes	Yes	—N/a	—N/a	Yes	Yes
CECHFxx	80 GB	Unreleased											
CECHGxx	40 GB	October 2007	—N/a	Yes	—N/a	Yes	Yes	Yes	Yes	Yes	Yes	Yes	Yes
CECHHxx	40 GB	October 2007	Yes	Yes	—N/a	Yes	Yes	Yes	Yes	Yes	Yes	Yes	Yes
CECHIxx	40 GB	Unreleased											
CECHJxx	40 GB	August 2008	Yes	—N/a	Yes	Yes	Yes	—N/a	—N/a	—N/a	—N/a	—N/a	—N/a
CECHKxx	80 GB	August 2008	—N/a	Yes	Yes	Yes	Yes	Yes	Yes	Yes	Yes	Yes	Yes
CECHLxx	80 GB	October 2008	—N/a	Yes	Yes	Yes	Yes	Yes	Yes	Yes	Yes	Yes	Yes
CECHMxx	80 GB	October 2008	—N/a	—N/a	—N/a	Yes	—N/a	—N/a	—N/a	—N/a	—N/a	—N/a	—N/a
CECHNxx	80 GB	Unreleased											
CECHOxx	80 GB	Unreleased											
CECHPxx	160 GB	October 2008	Yes	Yes	—N/a	Yes	Yes	Yes	Yes	Yes	—N/a	—N/a	Yes
CECHQxx	160 GB	April 2009	Yes	—N/a	—N/a	—N/a	—N/a	—N/a	—N/a	—N/a	—N/a	—N/a	—N/a
CECH‑20xxA	120 GB	September 2009	Yes	Yes	Yes	Yes	Yes	Yes	Yes	Yes	Yes	Yes	Yes
CECH‑20xxB	250 GB	October 2009	Yes	Yes	Yes	Yes	Yes	Yes	Yes	Yes	Yes	Yes	Yes
CECH‑21xxA	120 GB	March 2010	Yes	Yes	—N/a	Yes	Yes	Yes	—N/a	Yes	—N/a	—N/a	Yes
CECH‑21xxB	250 GB	March 2010	Yes	Yes	—N/a	Yes	Yes	Yes	—N/a	Yes	—N/a	—N/a	Yes
CECH‑25xxA	160 GB	July 2010	Yes	Yes	Yes	Yes	Yes	Yes	Yes	Yes	Yes	—N/a	Yes
CECH‑25xxB	320 GB	July 2010	Yes	Yes	Yes	Yes	Yes	Yes	Yes	Yes	Yes	Yes	Yes
CECH‑30xxA	160 GB	July 2011	Yes	Yes	Yes	Yes	Yes	Yes	Yes	Yes	Yes	Yes	Yes
CECH‑30xxB	320 GB	July 2011	Yes	Yes	Yes	Yes	Yes	Yes	Yes	Yes	Yes	Yes	Yes
CECH‑40xxA	12 GB	October 2012	Yes	Yes	Yes	Yes	Yes	Yes	—N/a	Yes	Yes	Yes	Yes
CECH‑40xxB	250 GB	September 2012	—N/a	Yes	—N/a	Yes	—N/a	—N/a	—N/a	—N/a	—N/a	—N/a	—N/a
CECH‑40xxC	500 GB	September 2012	—N/a	—N/a	Yes	Yes	Yes	—N/a	—N/a	—N/a	—N/a	—N/a	—N/a
CECH‑42xxA	12 GB	June 2013	Yes	Yes	—N/a	Yes	Yes	Yes	—N/a	Yes	Yes	Yes	Yes
CECH‑42xxB	250 GB	June 2013	—N/a	Yes	—N/a	Yes	—N/a	—N/a	—N/a	—N/a	—N/a	—N/a	—N/a
CECH‑42xxC	500 GB	June 2013	—N/a	—N/a	Yes	Yes	—N/a	—N/a	—N/a	—N/a	—N/a	—N/a	—N/a
CECH‑43xxA	12 GB	May 2014	Yes	Yes	—N/a	Yes	Yes	Yes	—N/a	Yes	Yes	Yes	Yes
CECH‑43xxB	250 GB	May 2014	—N/a	Yes	—N/a	Yes	—N/a	—N/a	—N/a	—N/a	—N/a	—N/a	—N/a
CECH‑43xxC	500 GB	May 2014	—N/a	—N/a	Yes	Yes	—N/a	—N/a	—N/a	—N/a	—N/a	—N/a	—N/a

== Connectivity ==
Supported resolutions
Resolution	Region	Composite	S-Video	Component	D-Terminal	HDMI
480i	NTSC	Yes	Yes	Yes	Yes	No
480p	NTSC	No	No	Yes	Yes	Yes
576i	PAL	Yes	Yes	Yes	Yes	No
576p	PAL	No	No	Yes	Yes	Yes
720p	NTSC / PAL	No	No	Yes	Yes	Yes
1080i	NTSC / PAL	No	No	Yes	Yes	Yes
1080p	NTSC / PAL	No	No	Yes	Yes	Yes

In terms of audio, the PS3 supports outputting up to 7.1 digital audio over HDMI in several codecs including AAC, Dolby Digital, Dolby Digital Plus, Dolby TrueHD, DTS, DTS-HD Master Audio and LPCM at 44.1, 48, 88, 96, 176.4 and 192 kHz. The PS3 slim features an upgraded HDMI chip that allows bitstreaming of lossless codecs to an external receiver, earlier versions had to decode the signal internally before outputting it via LPCM.

In the early 60 and 80 GB configurations, flash memory can also be used, either Memory Sticks; CompactFlash cards; or SD/MMC cards. All models support USB memory devices; flash drives and external hard drives are both automatically recognized. However, they must be formatted with the FAT32 file system.

Early systems (20, 60, and NTSC 80 GB configurations) were equipped with four USB 2.0 ports at the front of the console. All other configurations had just two.

For networking, all models provide one Gigabit Ethernet port, Bluetooth 2.0 support, and except for the original 20 GB configuration, built-in 802.11b/g Wi-Fi.

== Physical appearance ==
Model	Dimensions (when laid flat, width × height × depth)	Weight
Original ("Fat")	325 mm × 98 mm × 274 mm (12.8 in × 3.9 in × 10.8 in)	5 kg (11 lb)
Slim	290 mm × 98 mm × 290 mm (11.4 in × 3.9 in × 11.4 in)	3.2 kg (7.1 lb)
Super Slim	290 mm × 60 mm × 230 mm (11.4 in × 2.4 in × 9.1 in)	2.1 kg (4.6 lb)

The PlayStation 3 retained the same basic design across its three major hardware revisions, featuring a black plastic shell with a convex top when placed horizontally, or a convex-left side when oriented vertically.

The original ("Fat") model used glossy piano black plastic and featured a logo inspired by the font used in the 2002 Spider-Man film, also produced by Sony. According to PlayStation designer Teiyu Goto, this logo was one of the first design elements selected by SCEI president Ken Kutaragi and helped shape the console's overall aesthetic, which had a glossy piano-black finish and touch-sensitive power and eject buttons.

The font would be abandoned at the introduction of the "Slim" revision in favor of an updated version of the PS2 logo with more curved edges, which was also quieter and more compact than its predecessor.

The "Super Slim" model weighs approximately 25% less than the "Slim" due in part to the slot-loading Blu-ray drive being replaced with a top-load disc reader similar to the original PlayStation's, but with a sliding cover.

== Power supply ==
All models of the PlayStation console series are equipped with a universal power supply capable of operating on AC input voltages ranging from 100 to 240 V at either 50 or 60 Hz. The original models use a standard IEC 60320 C14 inlet, paired with a region-appropriate C13 power cord. Later revisions, including the "Slim" and "Super Slim" models, utilize a smaller C8 inlet and a corresponding C7 power cord.

The initial internal power supply was rated at 380 W (although power draw only ranged from 170 to 200 W during use), but this was gradually reduced in subsequent hardware revisions, reaching a rating of 190 W in the final "Super Slim" model.

== Disc drive ==
The PlayStation 3 features an optical disc drive that supports multiple formats, including Blu-ray, DVD, and CD. Region coding is enforced for applicable media types, and support for certain formats vary by hardware revision. Additionally, the console can play back discs with compressed audio files in the MP3, WMA, and ATRAC formats, images in the JPEG format, and videos in the MPEG-4 format.

=== Blu-ray ===
With Blu-ray discs, the drive has a maximum read speed of 2× (72 Mbit/s or 8.58 MB/s).

Supported formats include:

- PlayStation 3 BD-ROM
- BD-ROM
- BD-R
- BD-RE (version 1.0 not supported)
- BD-J (available via firmware update)

=== DVD ===
With DVDs, the drive has a maximum read speed of 8× (86.4 Mbit/s or 10.3 MB/s).

Supported formats include:

- PlayStation 2 DVD-ROM (early models only)
- DVD-ROM
- DVD-R, DVD-RW
- DVD+R, DVD+RW
- AVCHD
- DSD Disc
- Super Audio CD (early models only)

=== CD ===
With CDs, the drive has a maximum read speed of 24× (29.49 Mbit/s or 3.51 MB/s).

Supported formats include:

- PlayStation CD-ROM
- PlayStation 2 CD-ROM (early models only)
- CD-ROM
- CD-R, CD-RW
- CD-DA

== Official accessories ==
The PlayStation 3 Sixaxis is a controller that is very similar in appearance to that of its predecessors, the DualShock and DualShock 2. The SIXAXIS features finer analog sensitivity; more trigger-like R2 and L2 buttons; a PS ("home") button; and a USB mini-B port for charging the internal battery and for wired play. The PlayStation 3 supports up to 7 simultaneous controllers over Bluetooth. The Sixaxis is named for its ability to detect motion in the full six degrees. The Sixaxis controller which has "Sixaxis" printed on the front of the controller above the charging port, and to the right, does not vibrate.

At its press conference at the 2007 Tokyo Game Show, Sony announced the DualShock 3 (trademarked DUALSHOCK 3), a PlayStation 3 controller with the same function and design as the Sixaxis, but with vibration capability. Hands-on accounts describe the controller as being slightly heavier than the standard Sixaxis controller, and capable of vibration forces comparable to the DualShock 2. It has "DualShock 3" printed on the front right of the controller; in the place where the previous models had "Sixaxis" printed. And "Sixaxis" is now moved to the lower front right of the controller, below the "DualShock 3" printing.

The PlayStation 3 Memory Card Adaptor is a device that allows data to be transferred from PlayStation and PlayStation 2 memory cards to the PlayStation 3's hard disk. The device has a cable that connects to the PS3's USB port on one end, and features a legacy PS2 memory card port on the other end.

Using Bluetooth, the PlayStation 3 BD Remote allows users to control videos and music on Blu-ray Disc and DVD. In Japan, the device was available starting December 7, 2006. The PS3 will accept signals only via its Bluetooth Remote, as the console does not have an infrared receiver; this prevents the use of universal remotes with the system. The Blu-ray Disc movie Talladega Nights: The Ballad of Ricky Bobby was included with the initial 400,000 release copies of the PS3 in North America, while the first 500,000 European PlayStation Network activations after launch received a free copy of the Blu-ray release of Casino Royale.

On April 25, 2007, Sony announced the PlayStation Eye. This is an updated version of the PlayStation 2 peripheral, the EyeToy. The camera is capable of capturing 60 frames per second video at 640×480 resolution and 120 frame/s video at 320×240 resolution. The four-channel microphone on the Eye can block out background noise. The camera supports live video chat and voice chat without a headset, and was launched in the United States on October 23, 2007, for US$39.99, and in Australia on November 8, 2007, for A$79.95. It was also bundled with the card game The Eye of Judgment released in the United States on the same day as the camera itself for US$69.99, and in Japan and Australia on October 25, 2007, for JP¥9,980 and A$159.95, respectively.

Official PlayStation 3 HDMI and Component AV cables are also available for retail.

== Backward compatibility ==
All PlayStation 3 models feature backwards compatibility with all titles released for the original PlayStation, while original models (up to the 60 GB CECHCxx/80 GB CECHExx models) featured PlayStation 2 playback. The first two models (CECHA and B) featured an integrated Emotion Engine and Graphics Synthesizer within the PlayStation 3's SoC; the CECHC and E models eschewed the Emotion Engine for an emulated version through the Cell chip, but retained the Graphics Synthesizer. Saving games in PlayStation/PlayStation 2 titles require a virtual memory card to be created by the user; a memory card adapter is available so users can copy their old PS/PS2 game saves to a virtual memory card on the PS3's hard drive. On all consoles, including non-backwards compatible models, select PlayStation 2 titles may also be played as "PS2 Classics", which packages an emulated version of the game through the PlayStation Store. Jailbreaking the console allows the user to play titles that were not released on the PlayStation Store through the same emulation method used by Sony for their PS2 Classics.

The PlayStation 3 does not include interfaces for legacy PlayStation peripherals, though IGN.com tested a legacy controller using a PS2-to-USB adapter, finding that it is compatible, though most other devices (such as the Guitar Hero controller) may not be compatible. However, with the release of firmware 1.70 for the PlayStation 3, Sony has added support for previous Guitar Hero controllers with generic PS2-to-USB adapters (although the whammy bar is not functional). Nyko started production on the "Play Adaptor", a PS2-to-USB adapter allowing for guitars and other PlayStation 2 peripherals to be used on the PlayStation 3 and was scheduled for release in Q2/2007, but Nyko stated at the end of March that the production of this device had been postponed due to compatibility problems with the PS3. The PS3 supports both the USB EyeToy camera/webcam and SOCOM Headset for video and voice chat. The PlayStation 3 can also use Memory Sticks to store and save data for PlayStation and PlayStation 2 software.

== See also ==
- PlayStation technical specifications
- PlayStation 2 technical specifications
- PlayStation 4 technical specifications
