= DIMM =

Computer memory module

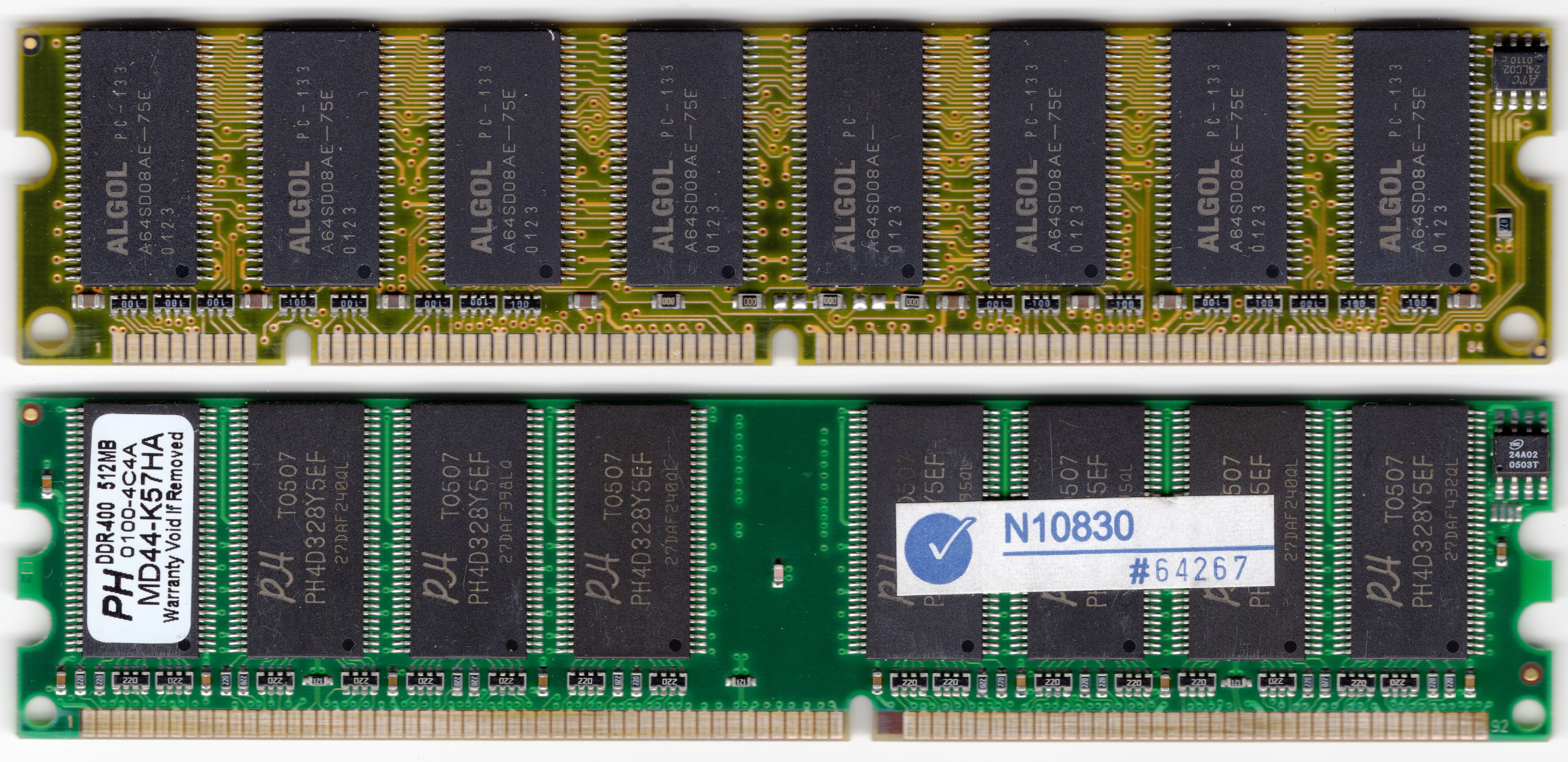
Two types of DIMMs: a 168-pin SDRAM module (top) and a 184-pin DDR SDRAM module (bottom). The SDRAM module has two notches (rectangular cuts or incisions) on the bottom edge, while the DDR1 SDRAM module has one. Also, each module has eight RAM chips, but the lower one has an unoccupied space for the ninth chip; this space is occupied in ECC DIMMs.

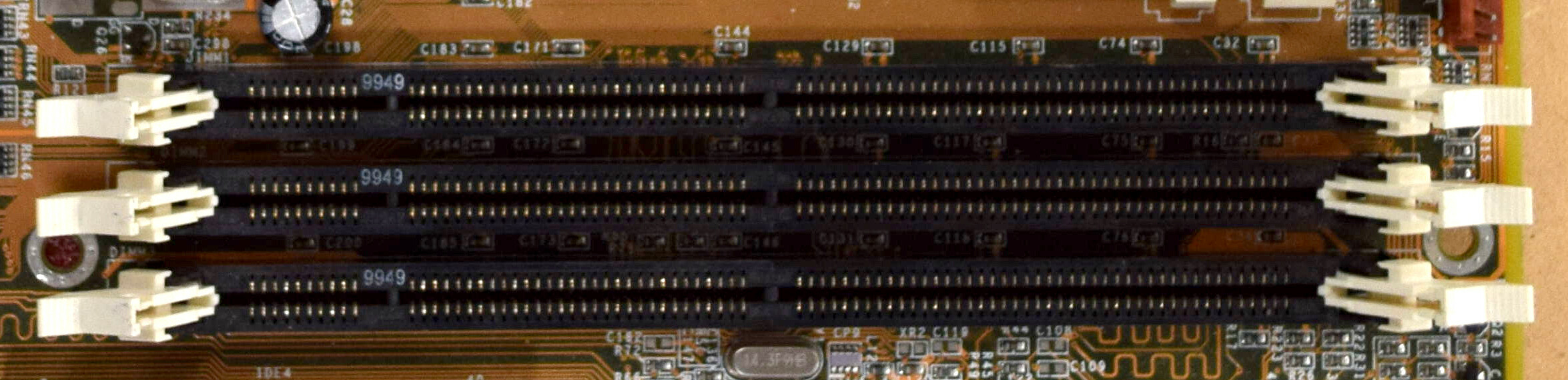
Three SDRAM DIMM slots on a ABIT BP6 computer motherboard.

A DIMM (Dual In-line Memory Module) is a type of memory module used in computers. It is a printed circuit board with one or both sides (front and back) holding DRAM chips and pins. The vast majority of DIMMs are manufactured in compliance with JEDEC memory standards, although there are proprietary DIMMs. DIMMs come in a variety of speeds and capacities, and are generally one of two lengths: PC, which are 133.35 mm (5.25 in), and laptop (SO-DIMM), which are about half the length at 67.60 mm (2.66 in).

== History ==
DIMMs (Dual In-line Memory Module) were a 1990s upgrade for SIMMs (Single In-line Memory Modules). The first known DIMM was developed by James Testa, Andreas Bechtolsheim, Edward Frank, Trevor Creary, David Emberson, Shawn Storm, and Bradley Hoffert at Sun Microsystems for the SparcStation 10, released in 1992 (referred to as a "dual-readout SIMM in US Patent No. 5,265,218 issued November 23, 1993). In 1995, JEDEC introduced the 198-pin DIMM standard, adopted by Intel as the Intel P5-based Pentium processors began to gain market share. The Pentium had a 64-bit bus width, which would require 32-bit memory modules installed in matched pairs in order to populate the data bus. The processor would then access the two 32-bit SIMM modules in parallel. The name "DIMM" was chosen as an acronym for Dual In-line Memory Module symbolizing the split in the contacts of a SIMM into two independent rows.

DIMMs were introduced to eliminate this disadvantage. The contacts on SIMMs on both sides are redundant, while DIMMs have separate electrical contacts on each side of the module. This allowed them to double the SIMMs 32-bit data path into a 64-bit data path.

== Form factors ==
=== Widths ===
DIMMs come in a number of board sizes. In order of descending size: DIMM, SO-DIMM, MiniDIMM, and MicroDIMM.

Regular DIMMs are generally 133.35 mm in length, while SO-DIMMs are generally 67.6 mm in length.

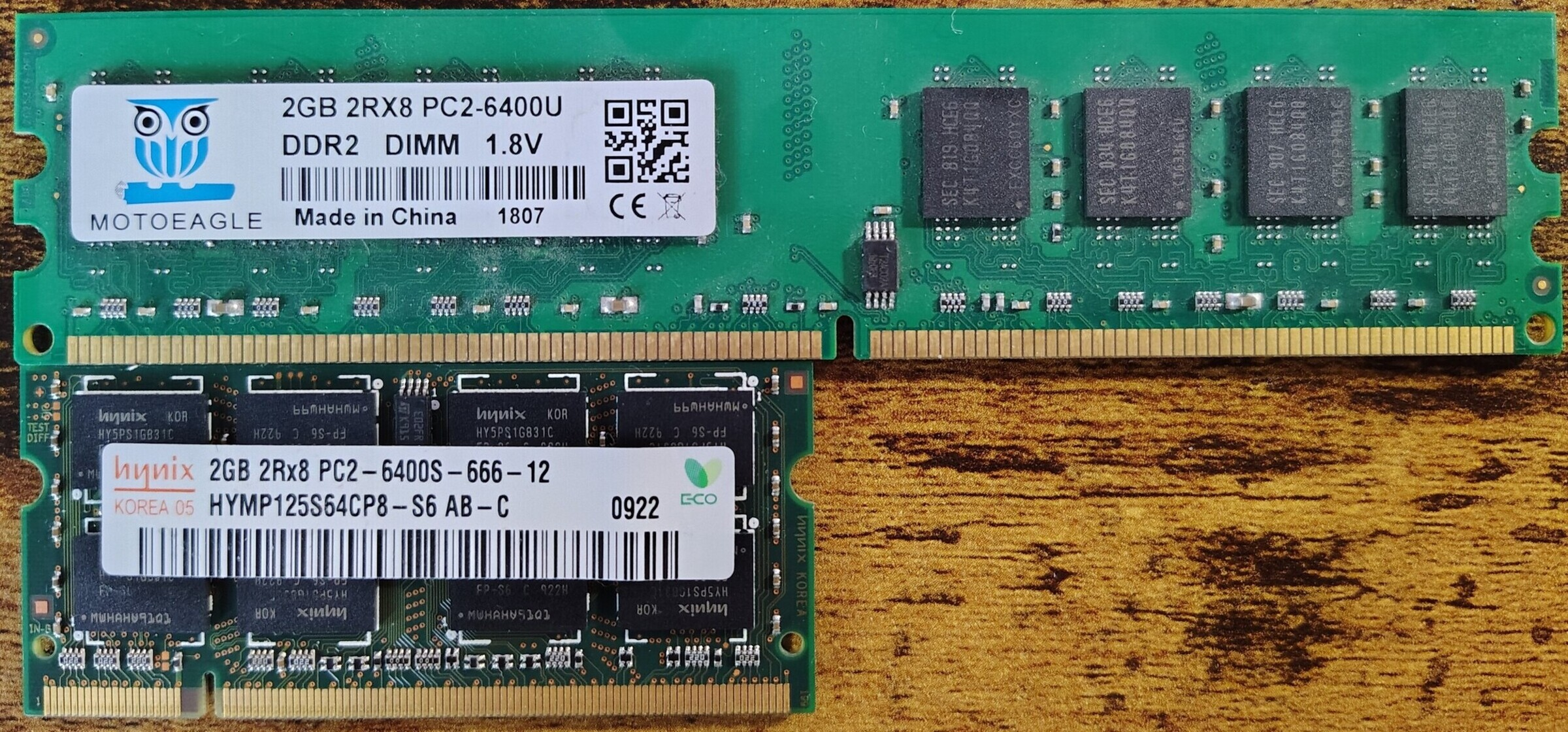
Comparison of DDR2 DIMM and SODIMM modules

==== DIMM ====
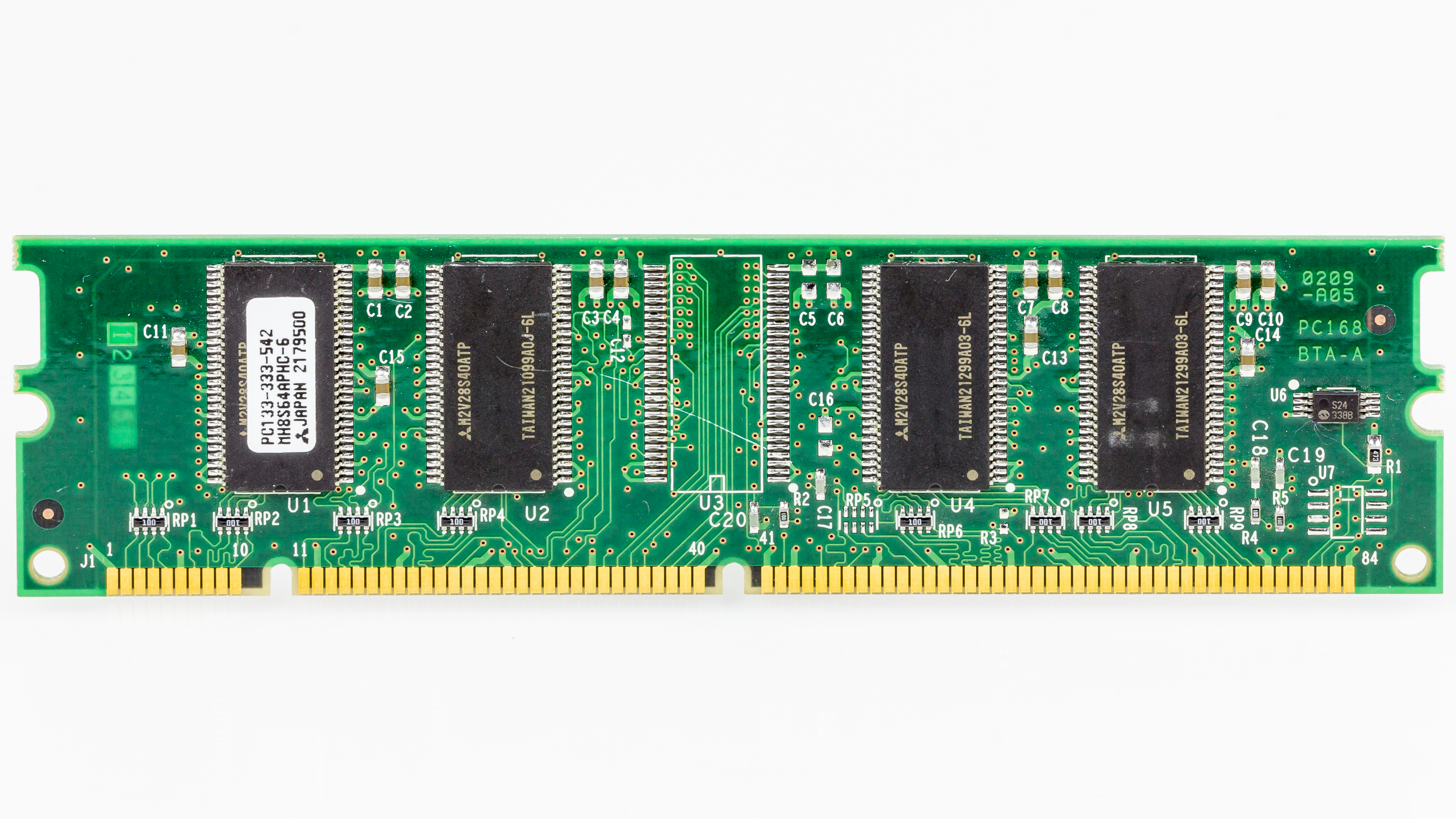
Mitsubishi DIMM MH8S64APHC-6 -4330 (Front Side)

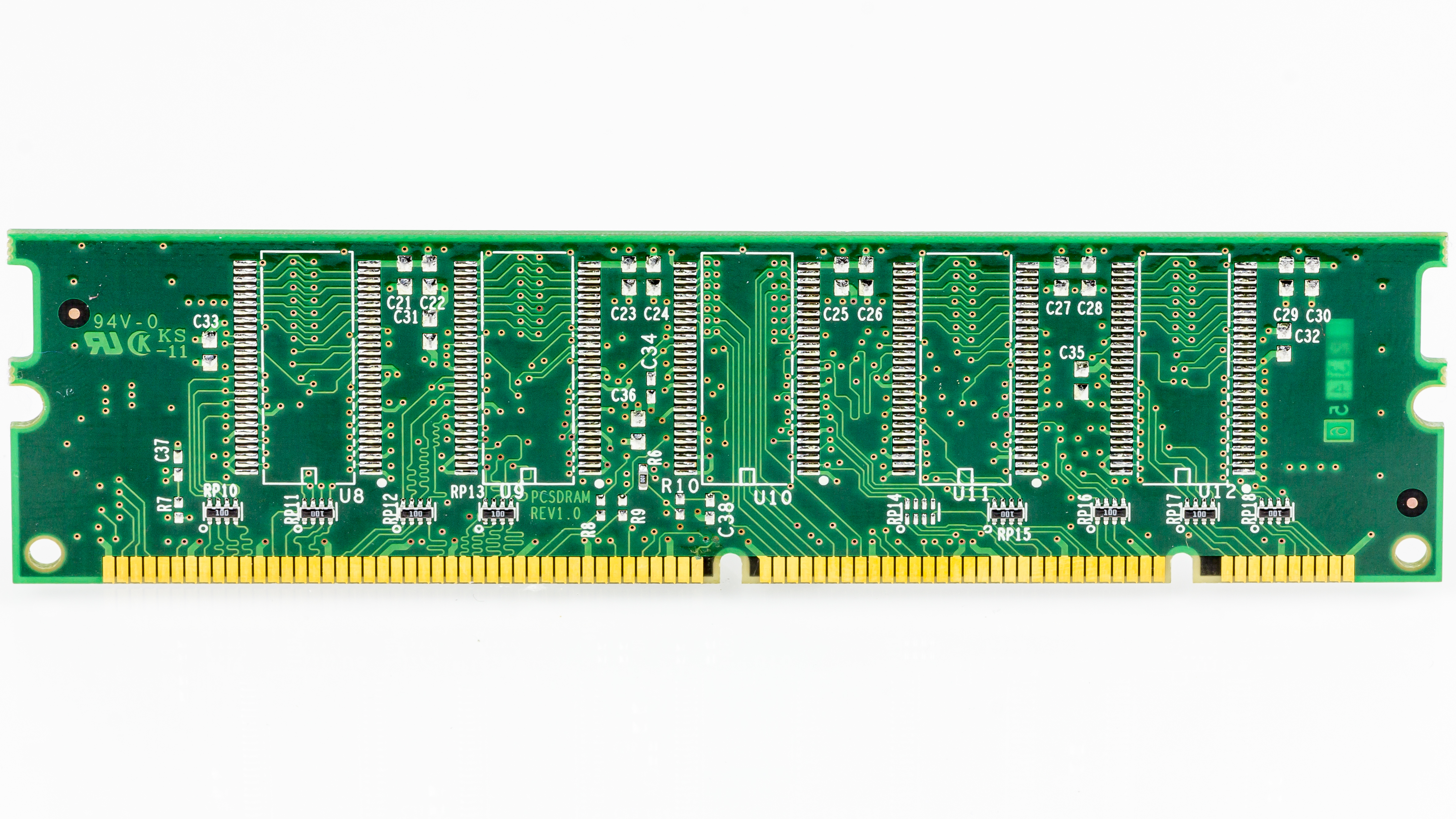
Mitsubishi DIMM MH8S64APHC-6 (Back Side)

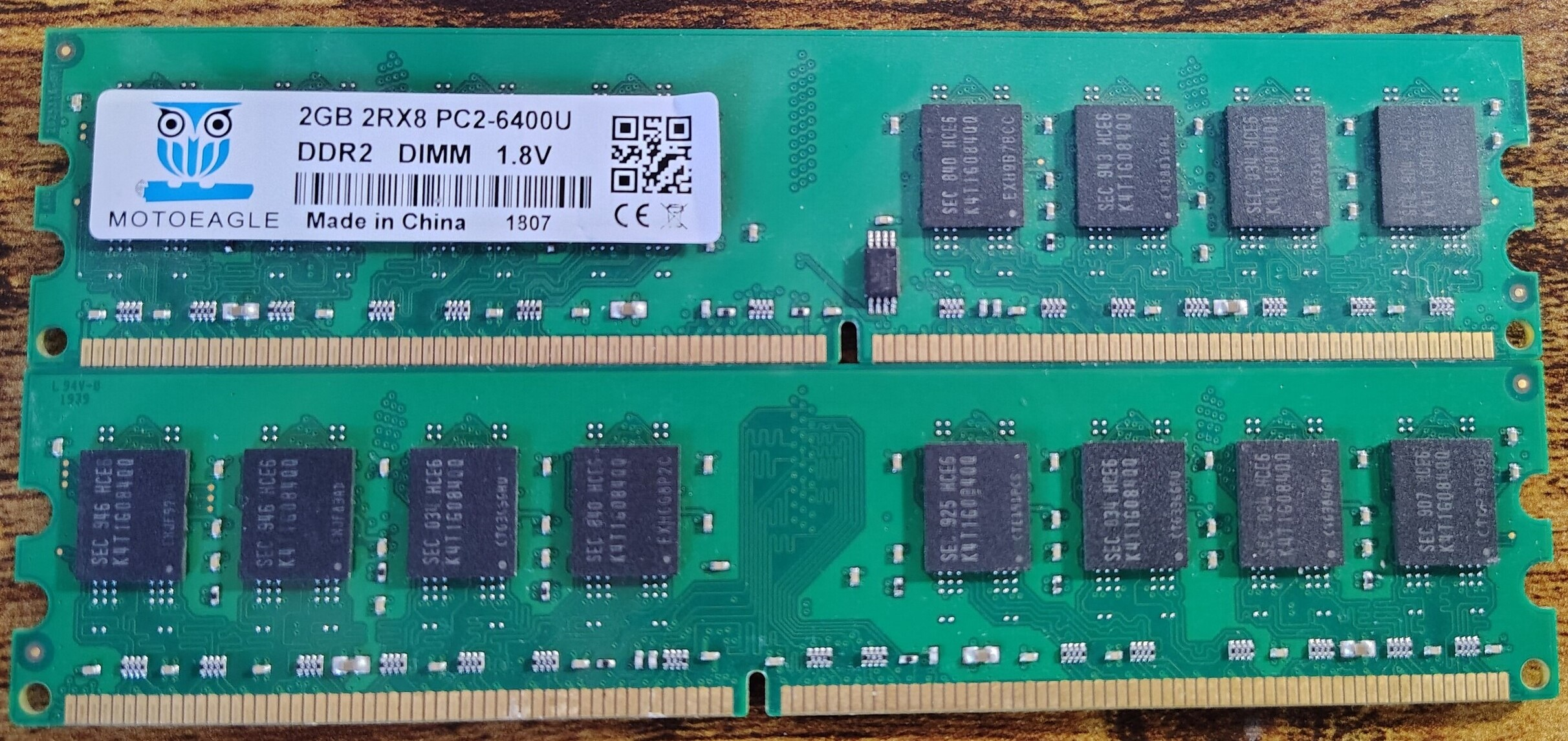
DDR2 DIMM Memory (Front and Back)

==== SO-DIMM ====
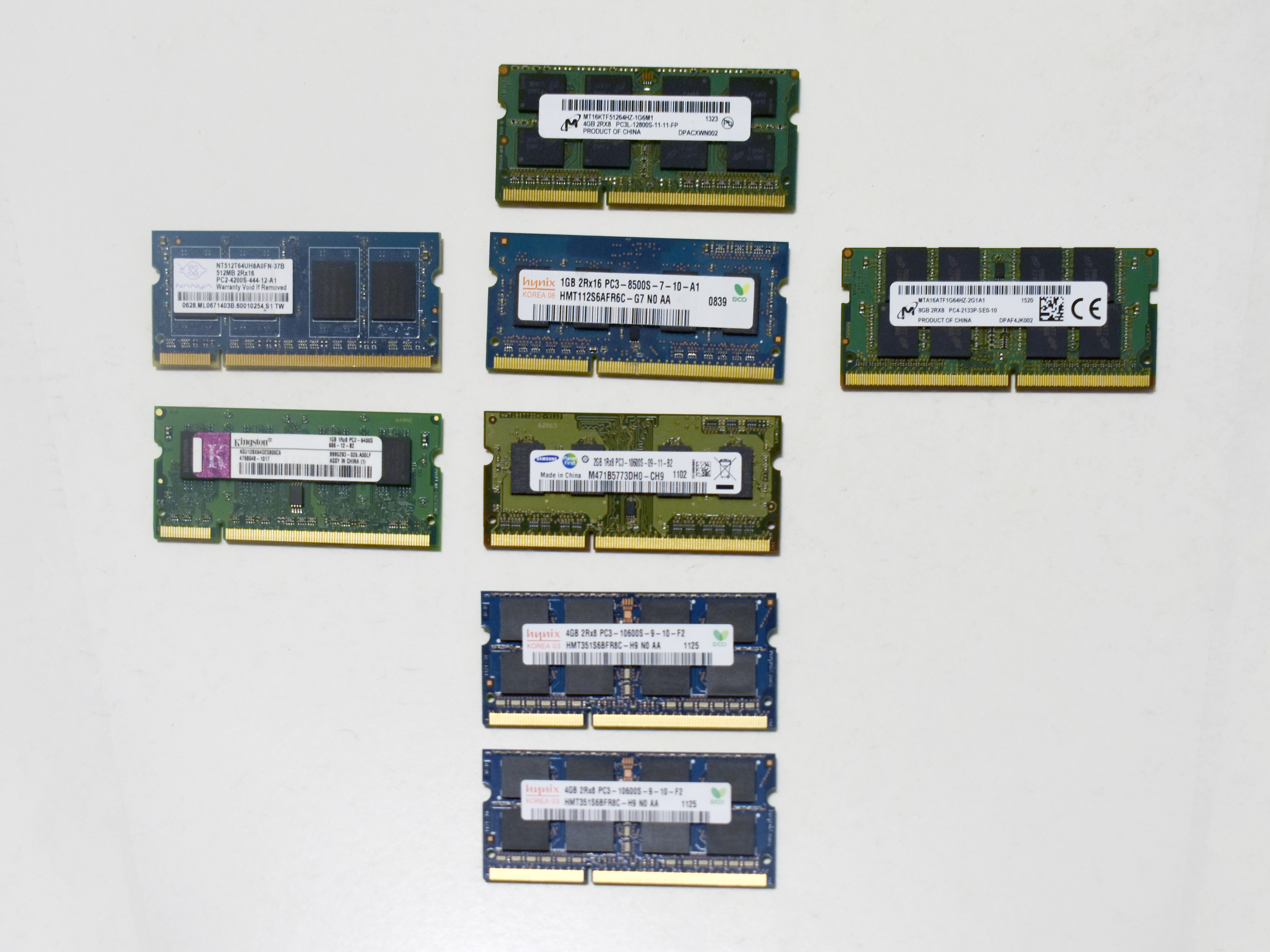
Assorted SO-DIMM Modules

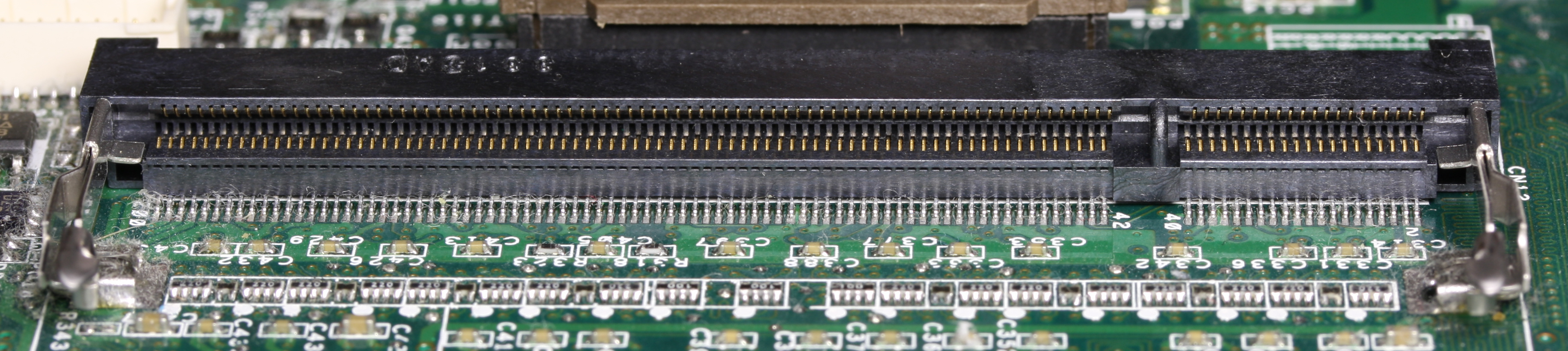
A DDR SO-DIMM slot on a computer motherboard.

A SO-DIMM (pronounced "so dim" /ˈsoʊdɪm/, also spelled SODIMM) or small outline DIMM, is a smaller alternative to a DIMM, being roughly half the physical size of a regular DIMM. The first SO-DIMMs had 72 pins and were introduced by JEDEC in 1997. Before its introduction, many laptops would use proprietary RAM modules which were expensive and hard to find.

SO-DIMMs are often used in computers that have limited space, which include laptops, notebook computers, small-footprint personal computers such as those based on Nano-ITX motherboards, high-end upgradable office printers, and networking hardware such as routers and NAS devices. They are usually available with the same size data path and speed ratings of the regular DIMMs though normally with smaller capacities.

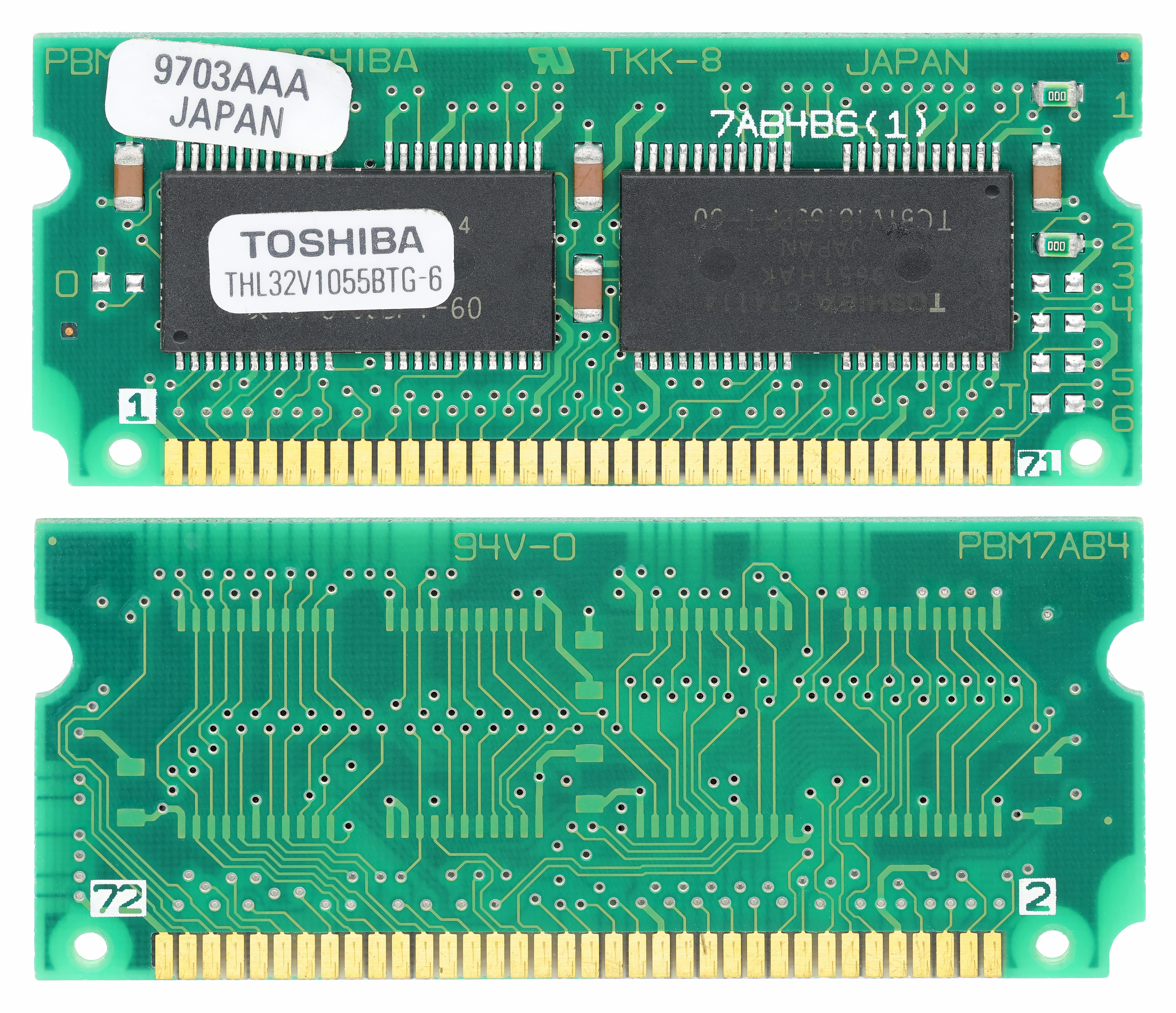
The original 72-pin SO-DIMM

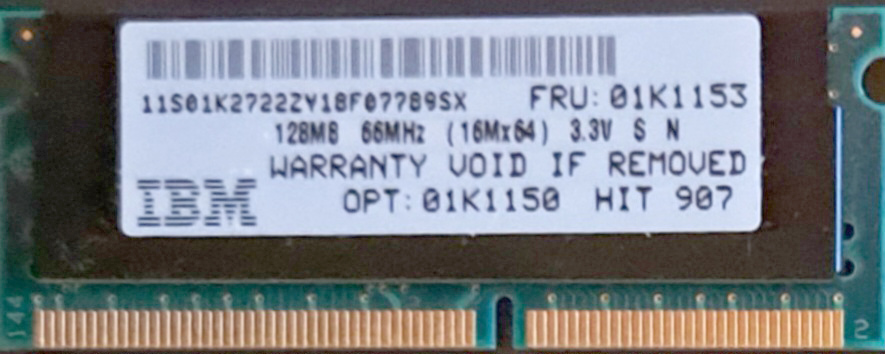
SO-DIMM SDR 144pin 128MB ram chip by IBM

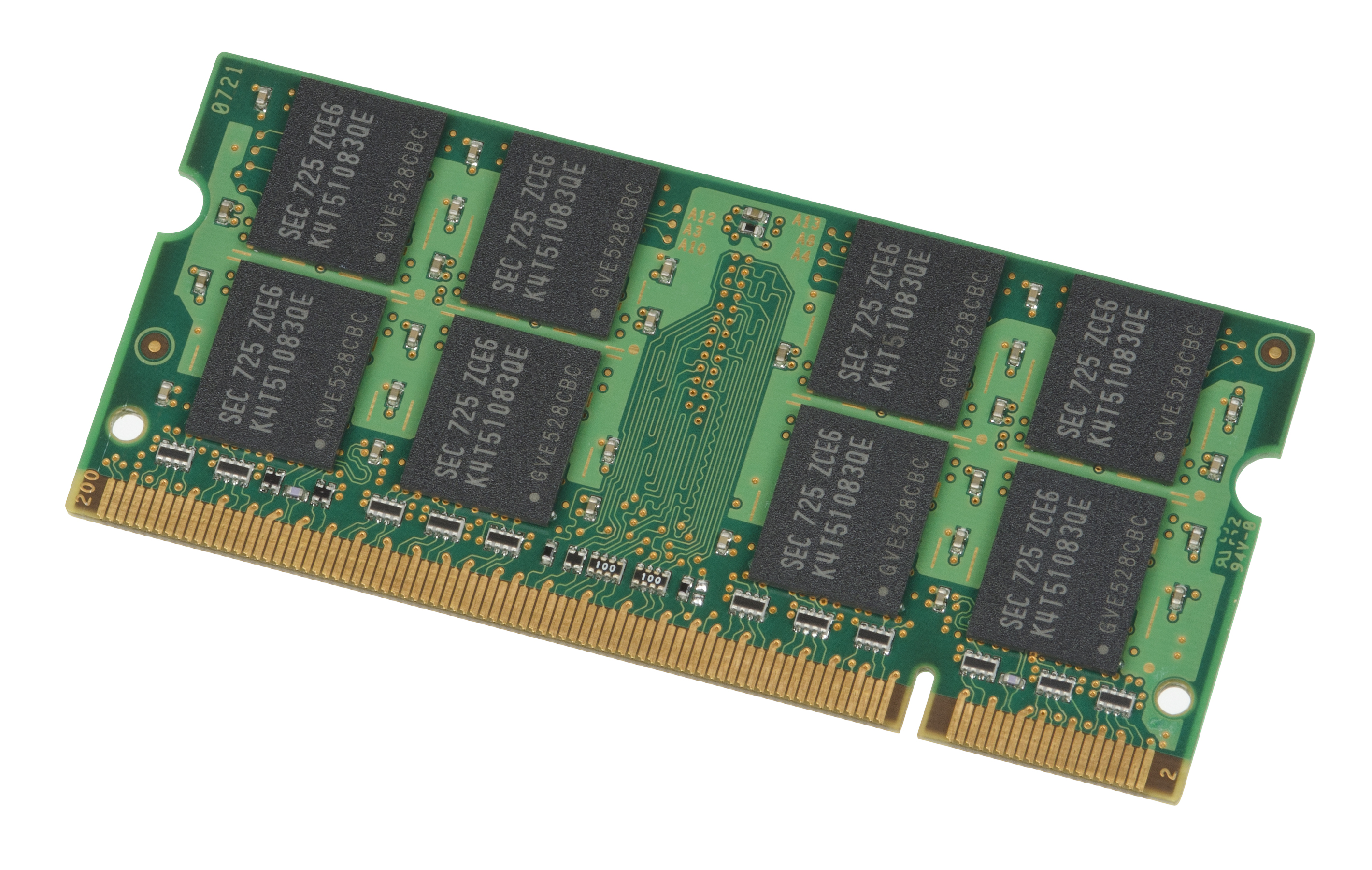
A 200-pin PC2-5300 DDR2 SO-DIMM.

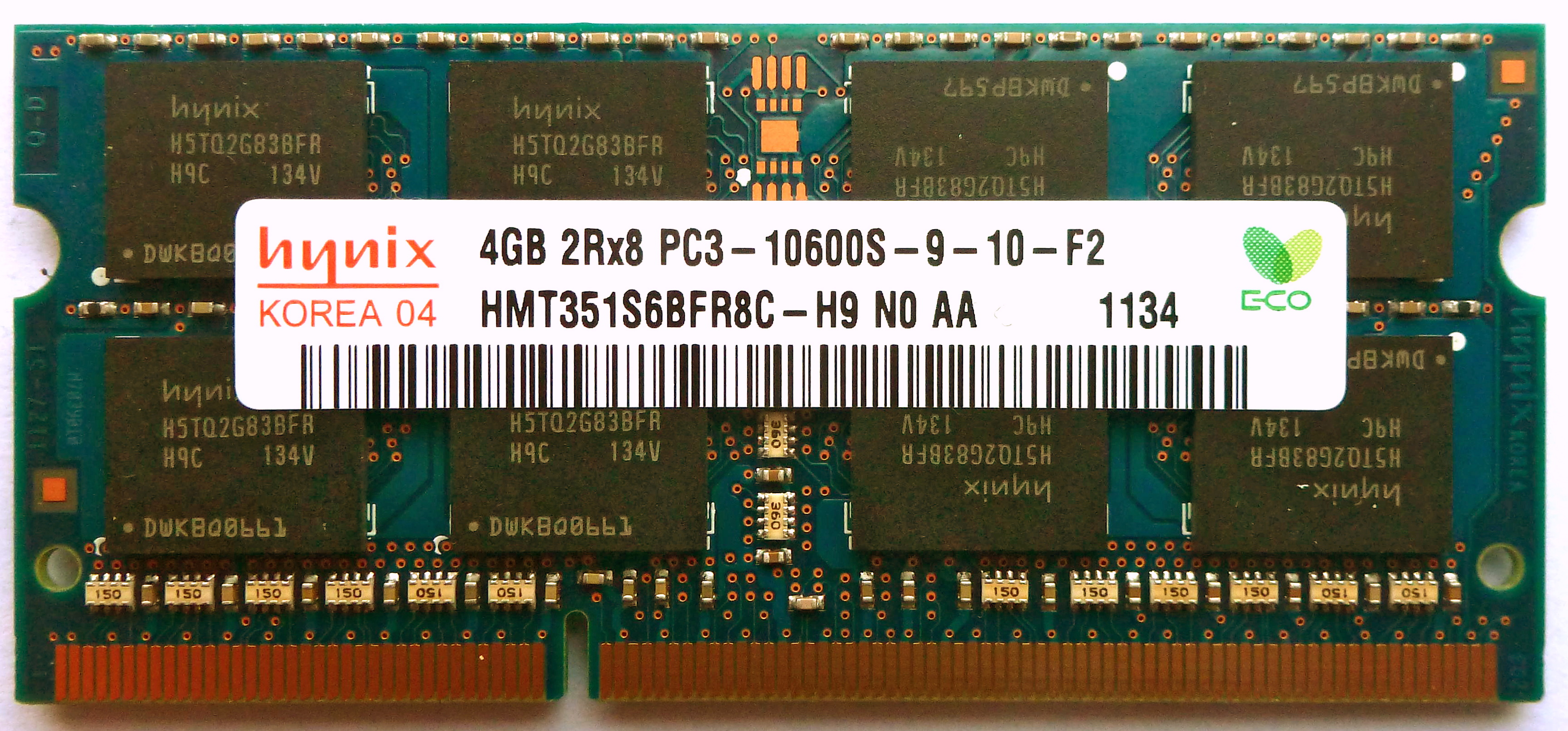
A 204-pin PC3-10600 DDR3 SO-DIMM.

==== Mini-DIMM ====
Mini-DIMM has a longer but a narrower profile than SO-DIMM. Mini-DIMM has more power and ground pins compared to SO-DIMM that makes them often used in telecom, networking, and industrial applications.

==== MicroDIMM ====
MicroDIMM is the smallest DIMM factor and is half the physical size of SO-DIMM. MicroDIMMs are often used in lightweight laptops and printers. MicroDIMM has only been iterated to DDR2.

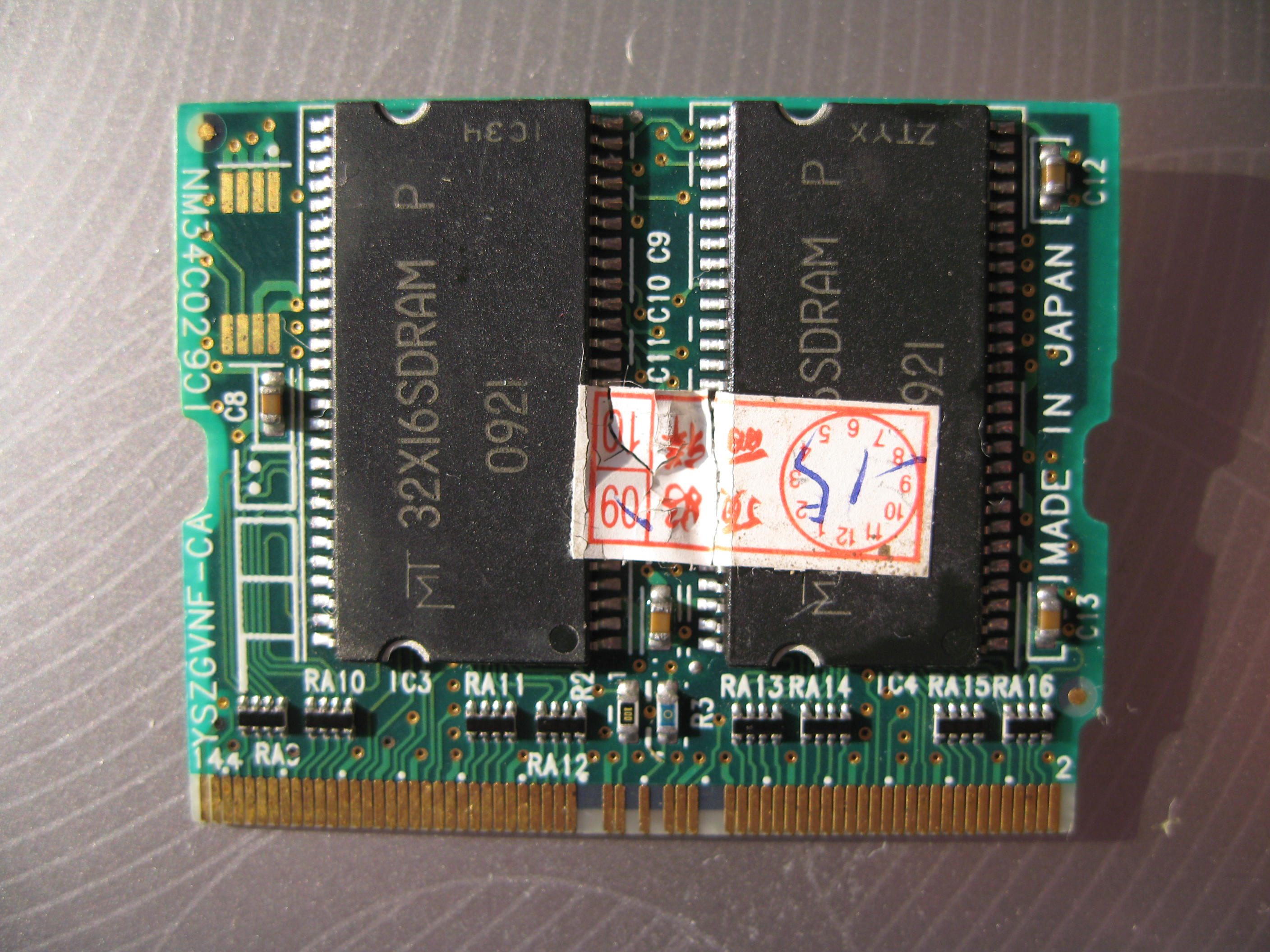
256 MB MicroDIMM PC133 SDRAM (double sided, 4 chips).

=== Connector ===
A comparison between 200-pin DDR and DDR2 SDRAM SO-DIMMs, and a 204-pin DDR3 SO-DIMM module. They share the same width but differ in pin and notch placement.

16 GiB DDR4-2666 1.2 V unbuffered DIMM (UDIMM).

Different generations of memory are not interchangeable: neither forward compatible nor backward compatible. To make this difference clear and avoid any confusion, their DIMM modules all have different pin counts and/or different notch positions. DDR5 SDRAM is the most recent type of DDR memory and has been in use since 2020.

DIMM
- 100-pin: printer SDRAM and printer ROM (e.g., PostScript)
- 168-pin: SDR SDRAM, sometimes used for FPM/EDO DRAM in workstations or servers, may be 3.3 or 5 V
- 184-pin: DDR SDRAM
- 200-pin: FPM/EDO DRAM in some Sun workstations and servers
- 240-pin: DDR2 SDRAM, DDR3 SDRAM and FB-DIMM DRAM
- 278-pin: HP high density SDRAM
- 288-pin: DDR4 SDRAM and DDR5 SDRAM
SO-DIMM
- 72-pin: FPM DRAM and EDO DRAM; different pin configuration from 72-pin SIMM
- 144-pin: SDR SDRAM, sometimes used for DDR2 SDRAM
- 200-pin: DDR SDRAM and DDR2 SDRAM
- 204-pin: DDR3 SDRAM
- 260-pin: DDR4 SDRAM
- 260-pin: UniDIMMs carrying either DDR3 or DDR4 SDRAM; differently notched than DDR4 SO-DIMMs
- 262-pin: DDR5 SDRAM
MiniDIMM
- 244-pin: DDR2 SDRAM
- 244-pin: DDR3 SDRAM
- 244-pin: DDR4 UDIMM
- 288-pin: DDR4 RDIMM
MicroDIMM
- 144-pin: SDRAM
- 172-pin: DDR SDRAM
- 214-pin: DDR2 SDRAM

Besides pin count there are also physical notches to differentiate the incompatible types of DIMM. For example, the ancient 168-pin SDR SDRAM had different voltage ratings (5.0 V or 3.3 V) and a difference of registered (buffered) vs unbuffered. As a result it has two notch positions to prevent the insertion of the wrong type of module.

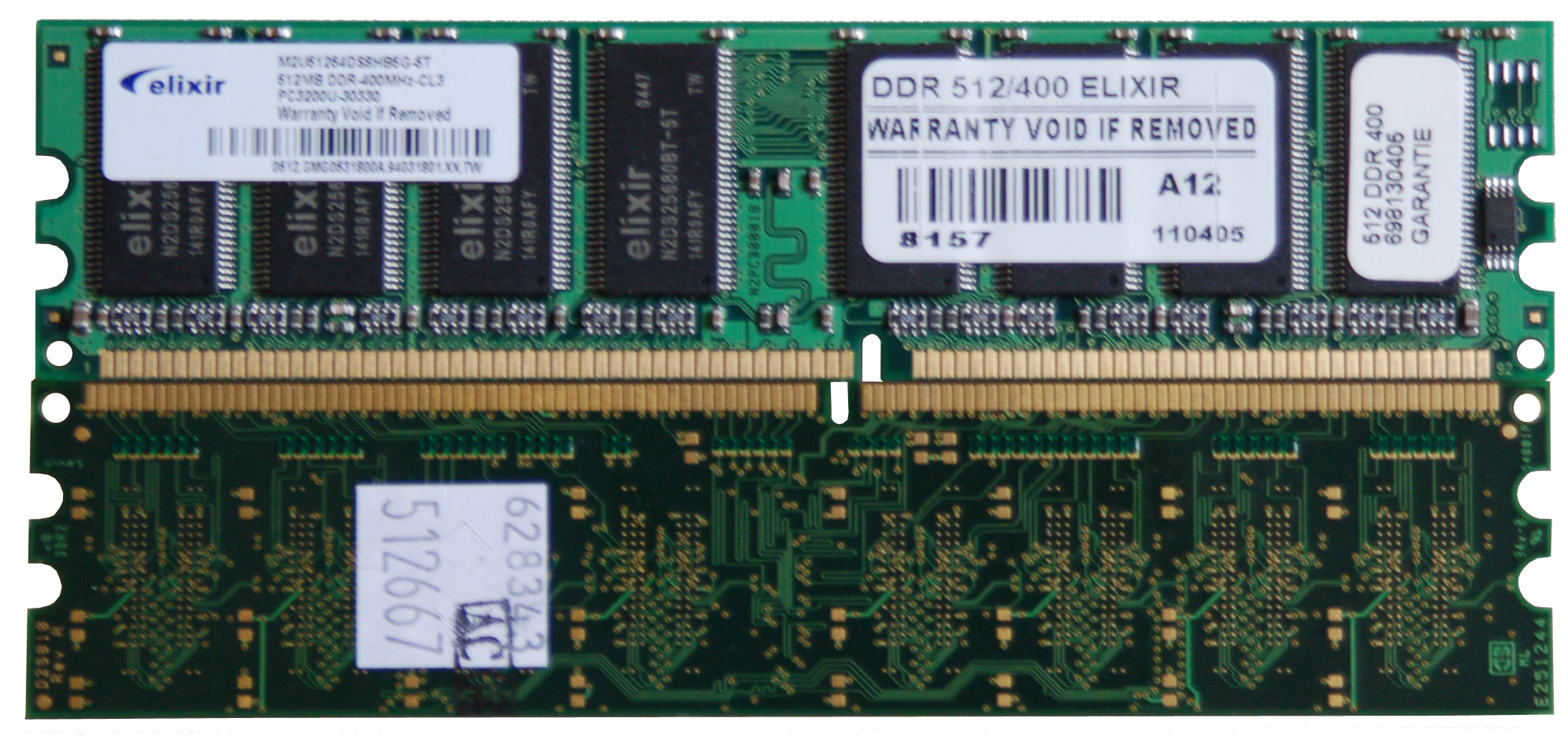
Notch positions on DDR (top) and DDR2 (bottom) DIMM modules.

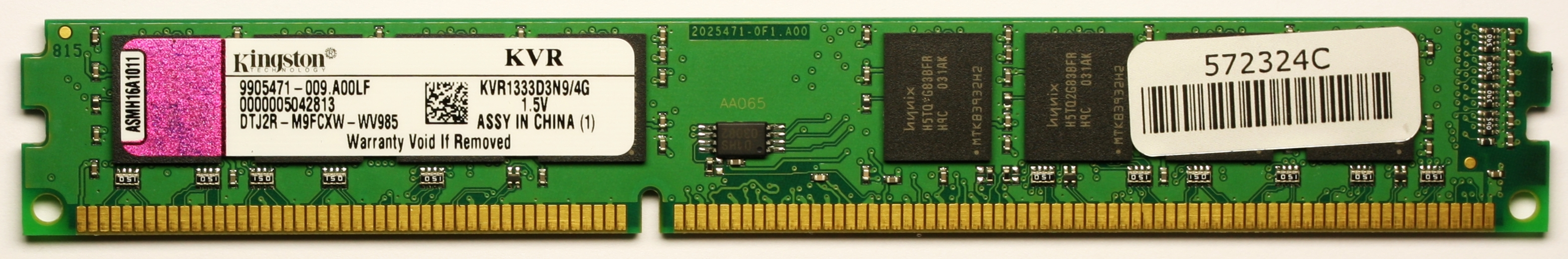
4 GB DDR VLP DIMM from Kingston Technology

=== Heights ===
Several form factors are commonly used in DIMMs. Single Data Rate Synchronous DRAM (SDR SDRAM) DIMMs were primarily manufactured in 1.5 inches (38 mm) and 1.7 inches (43 mm) heights, with the nominal value being 30 millimetres (1.2 in). When 1U rackmount servers started becoming popular, these form factor registered DIMMs had to plug into angled DIMM sockets to fit in the 1.75 inches (44 mm) high box. To alleviate this issue, the next standards of DDR DIMMs were created with a "low profile" (LP) height of around 1.2 inches (30 mm). These fit into vertical DIMM sockets for a 1U platform.

With the advent of blade servers, angled slots have once again become common in order to accommodate LP form factor DIMMs in these space-constrained boxes. This led to the development of the Very Low Profile (VLP) form factor DIMM with a height of around 18 millimetres (0.71 in). These will fit vertically in ATCA systems.

Very similar height levels are used for SO-DIMM, Mini-DIMM and Micro-DIMM.

JEDEC standard heights for DIMMs
Generation	Full-height (1U)		Very low profile (VLP)		Notes
Generation	Nominal	Maximum	Nominal	Maximum	Notes
DDR2	30.00 millimetres (1.181 in)	30.50 millimetres (1.201 in)	—N/a	—N/a	
DDR3	30.00 millimetres (1.181 in)	30.50 millimetres (1.201 in)	18.75 millimetres (0.738 in)	18.90 millimetres (0.744 in)	
DDR4	31.25 millimetres (1.230 in)	31.40 millimetres (1.236 in)	18.75 millimetres (0.738 in)	18.90 millimetres (0.744 in)	
DDR5	31.25 millimetres (1.230 in)	31.40 millimetres (1.236 in)	—N/a	—N/a	For DIMMs, there is a new height called 2U DIMM at 56.90 millimetres (2.240 in) nominal and 57.05 millimetres (2.246 in) max.; DDR5 and LPDDR5 also use CAMM2 units. These are mounted flush to the motherboard.

Notes:

- Low profile (LP) is not a JEDEC standard.
- The full JEDEC standards also regulate factors such as thickness.
- SO-DIMMs for DDR4 and DDR5 maintain the traditional height of 30.00±0.15 mm; see JEDEC MO-310A and MO-337B. The height increase for "full height" DIMM does not apply to SO-DIMM.
- It is common for higher-end consumer DDR4 DIMMs to exceed the JEDEC full height due to the use of an added heat sink. Some heat sinks add as little as 1 millimetre (0.039 in) while others add up to 5 millimetres (0.20 in).

=== Similar connectors ===
As of Q2 2017, Asus has had a PCIe based "DIMM.2", which has a similar socket to DDR3 DIMMs and is used to put in a module to connect up to two M.2 NVMe solid-state drives. However, it cannot use common DDR type ram and does not have much support from other than Asus.

== Components ==
=== Organization ===
Most DIMMs are built using "×4" ("by four") or "×8" ("by eight") memory chips with up to nine chips per side; "×4" and "×8" refer to the data width of the DRAM chips in bits. High-capacity DIMMs such as 256 GB DIMMs can have up to 19 chips per side.

In the case of "×4" registered DIMMs, the data width per side is 36 bits; therefore, the memory controller (which requires 72 bits) needs to address both sides at the same time to read or write the data it needs. In this case, the two-sided module is single-ranked. For "×8" registered DIMMs, each side is 72 bits wide, so the memory controller only addresses one side at a time (the two-sided module is dual-ranked).

The above example applies to ECC memory that stores 72 bits instead of the more common 64. There would also be one extra chip per group of eight, which is not counted.

==== Ranking ====
Sometimes, memory modules are designed with two or more independent sets of DRAM chips connected to the same address and data buses; each such set is called a rank. Of the ranks that share the same memory slot, i.e. on the same module, only one rank may be accessed at any given time. The rank to be accessed is specified by activating its chip select (CS) signal, while the other ranks on the same module are deactivated for the duration of the operation by having their corresponding CS signals deactivated.

After a memory word is fetched, the memory is typically inaccessible for an extended period of time while the sense amplifiers are charged for access of the next cell. These amplifiers typically have 3 cycles of idle time for recharging between accesses. By interleaving the memory (e.g. cells 0, 4, 8, ... are stored in one rank, cells 1, 5, 9, ... in another rank, and so on), sequential memory accesses can be performed more rapidly by alternating which rank is active, thus overlapping the active memory access with recharge time for the inactive ranks.

As of 2025, DIMMs are commonly manufactured with one, two, or four ranks per module. Consumer DIMM vendors have begun to distinguish between single- and dual-ranked DIMMs since around 2020.

DIMMs are often referred to as "single-sided" or "double-sided" to describe whether the DRAM chips are located on one or both sides of the module's printed circuit board (PCB). However, these terms may cause confusion, as the physical layout of the chips does not necessarily relate to how they are logically organized or accessed. Indeed, quad-ranked DIMMs exist.

JEDEC decided that the terms "dual-sided", "double-sided", or "dual-banked" were not correct when applied to registered DIMMs (RDIMMs).

Multiplexed Rank DIMM (MRDIMM) allow data from multiple ranks to be transmitted on the same channel. It was announced for DDR5 in July 2024 and is expected to be backwards compatible with DDR5 RDIMM.

=== SPD EEPROM ===
A DIMM's capacity and other operational parameters may be identified with serial presence detect (SPD), an additional chip which contains information about the module type and timing for the memory controller to be configured correctly. The SPD EEPROM connects to the System Management Bus and may also contain thermal sensors (TS-on-DIMM).

== Features ==
=== Speeds ===
For various technologies, there are certain bus and device clock frequencies that are standardized; there is also a decided nomenclature for each of these speeds for each type.

DIMMs based on Single Data Rate (SDR) DRAM have the same bus frequency for data, address and control lines. DIMMs based on Double Data Rate (DDR) DRAM have data but not the strobe at double the rate of the clock; this is achieved by clocking on both the rising and falling edge of the data strobes. Power consumption and voltage gradually became lower with each generation of DDR-based DIMMs.

Another influence is Column Access Strobe (CAS) latency, or CL, which affects memory access speed. This is the delay time between the READ command and the moment data is available. See main article CAS/CL and memory timing.

SDR SDRAM DIMMs
Chip	Module	Effective clock (MHz)	Transfer rate (MT/s)	Voltage (V)
SDR-66	PC-66	66	66	3.3
SDR-100	PC-100	100	100	3.3
SDR-133	PC-133	133	133	3.3

DDR SDRAM (DDR1) DIMMs
Chip	Module	Memory clock (MHz)	I/O bus clock (MHz)	Transfer rate (MT/s)	Voltage (V)
DDR-200	PC-1600	100	100	200	2.5
DDR-266	PC-2100	133	133	266	2.5
DDR-333	PC-2700	166	166	333	2.5
DDR-400	PC-3200	200	200	400	2.6

DDR2 SDRAM DIMMs
Chip	Module	Memory clock (MHz)	I/O bus clock (MHz)	Transfer rate (MT/s)	Voltage (V)
DDR2-400	PC2-3200	100	200	400	1.8
DDR2-533	PC2-4200	133	266	533	1.8
DDR2-667	PC2-5300	166	333	667	1.8
DDR2-800	PC2-6400	200	400	800	1.8
DDR2-1066	PC2-8500	266	533	1066	1.8

DDR3 SDRAM DIMMs
Chip	Module	Memory clock (MHz)	I/O bus clock (MHz)	Transfer rate (MT/s)	Voltage (V)
DDR3-800	PC3-6400	100	400	800	1.5
DDR3-1066	PC3-8500	133	533	1066	1.5
DDR3-1333	PC3-10600	166	667	1333	1.5
DDR3-1600	PC3-12800	200	800	1600	1.5
DDR3-1866	PC3-14900	233	933	1866	1.5
DDR3-2133	PC3-17000	266	1066	2133	1.5
DDR3-2400	PC3-19200	300	1200	2400	1.5

DDR4 SDRAM DIMMs
Chip	Module	Memory clock (MHz)	I/O bus clock (MHz)	Transfer rate (MT/s)	Voltage (V)
DDR4-1600	PC4-12800	200	800	1600	1.2
DDR4-1866	PC4-14900	233	933	1866	1.2
DDR4-2133	PC4-17000	266	1066	2133	1.2
DDR4-2400	PC4-19200	300	1200	2400	1.2
DDR4-2666	PC4-21300	333	1333	2666	1.2
DDR4-3200	PC4-25600	400	1600	3200	1.2

DDR5 SDRAM DIMMs
Chip	Module	Memory clock (MHz)	I/O bus clock (MHz)	Transfer rate (MT/s)	Voltage (V)
DDR5-4000	PC5-32000	2000	2000	4000	1.1
DDR5-4400	PC5-35200	2200	2200	4400	1.1
DDR5-4800	PC5-38400	2400	2400	4800	1.1
DDR5-5200	PC5-41600	2600	2600	5200	1.1
DDR5-5600	PC5-44800	2800	2800	5600	1.1
DDR5-6000	PC5-48000	3000	3000	6000	1.1
DDR5-6200	PC5-49600	3100	3100	6200	1.1
DDR5-6400	PC5-51200	3200	3200	6400	1.1
DDR5-6800	PC5-54400	3400	3400	6800	1.1
DDR5-7200	PC5-57600	3600	3600	7200	1.1
DDR5-7600	PC5-60800	3800	3800	7600	1.1
DDR5-8000	PC5-64000	4000	4000	8000	1.1
DDR5-8400	PC5-67200	4200	4200	8400	1.1
DDR5-8800	PC5-70400	4400	4400	8800	1.1

=== Error correction ===
ECC DIMMs are those that have extra data bits which can be used by the system memory controller to detect and correct errors. There are numerous ECC schemes, but perhaps the most common is Single Error Correct, Double Error Detect (SECDED) which uses an extra byte per 64-bit word. ECC modules usually carry a multiple of 9 instead of a multiple of 8 chips as a result.

=== Register/buffer ===
It is electrically demanding for a memory controller to drive many DIMMs. Registered DIMMs add a hardware register to the clock, address, and command lines so that the signals are refreshed on the DIMM, allowing a reduced load on the memory controller. Variants include LRDIMM with all lines buffered and CUDIMM/CSODIMM with only the clock signal buffered. The register feature often occurs with ECC, but they do not actually depend on each other and can occur independently.

== See also ==
- Dual in-line package (DIP)
- Memory scrambling
- Memory geometry – logical configuration of RAM modules (channels, ranks, banks, etc.)
- Motherboard
- NVDIMM – non-volatile DIMM
- Row hammer
- Rambus in-line memory module (RIMM)
- Single in-line memory module (SIMM)
- Single in-line package (SIP)
- Zig-zag in-line package (ZIP)
- Compression Attached Memory Module (CAMM)
