= DDR SDRAM =

Type of computer memory

DDR SDRAM Double data rate synchronous dynamic random-access memory
- Comparison of DDR modules for desktop PCs (DIMM)

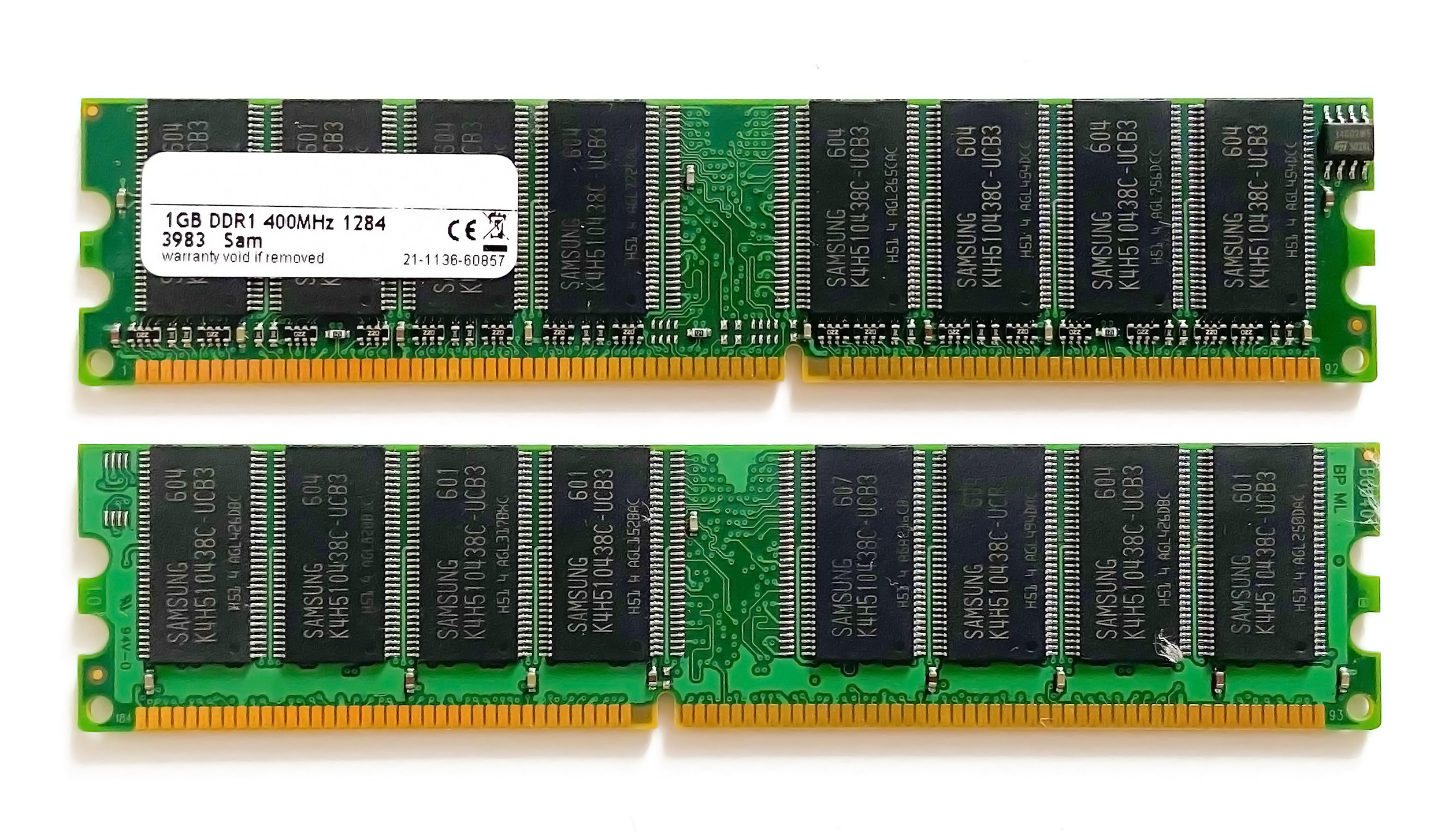
- Front and back of a 1GB DDR SDRAM module for desktop PCs (DIMM)
- Developer: Samsung; JEDEC
- Type: Synchronous dynamic random-access memory
- Generations: DDR2; DDR3; DDR4; DDR5; DDR6
- Release date: DDR: 1998; 28 years ago; DDR2: 2003; 23 years ago; DDR3: 2007; 19 years ago; DDR4: 2014; 12 years ago; DDR5: 2020; 6 years ago

Specifications
- Voltage: DDR: 2.5/2.6V; DDR2: 1.8V; DDR3(L): 1.5V/(1.35V); DDR4: 1.2V; DDR5: 1.1V
- Transfer Rate: DDR: 200-400 MT/s; DDR2: 400-1066 MT/s; DDR3: 800-2133 MT/s; DDR4: 1600-3200 MT/s; DDR5: 4000-8800 MT/s
- Bandwidth: DDR: 1.6-3.2 GB/s; DDR2: 3.2-8.5 GB/s; DDR3: 6.4-17.0 GB/s; DDR4: 12.8-25.6 GB/s; DDR5: 32.0-70.4 GB/s

Double data rate synchronous dynamic random-access memory (DDR SDRAM) is a type of synchronous dynamic random-access memory (SDRAM) widely used in computers and other electronic devices. It improves on earlier SDRAM technology by transferring data on both the rising and falling edges of the clock signal, effectively doubling the data rate without increasing the clock frequency. This technique, known as double data rate (DDR), allows for higher memory bandwidth while maintaining lower power consumption and reduced signal interference.

DDR SDRAM was first introduced in the late 1990s and is sometimes referred to as DDR1 to distinguish it from later generations. It has been succeeded by DDR2 SDRAM, DDR3 SDRAM, DDR4 SDRAM (1×32-bit channel), DDR5 SDRAM (2×32-bit subchannels), and upcoming DDR6 SDRAM (with 4×16-bit subchannels), each offering further improvements in speed, capacity, and efficiency. These generations are not backward or forward compatible, meaning memory modules from different DDR versions cannot be used interchangeably on the same motherboard.

In 2026, a cost-reduced HUDIMM was introduced, with only one 32-bit channel, not the usual two subchannels (and thus also half the bandwidth and capacity of DDR5), compatible with some DDR5-using motherboards. Another adaptation to skyrocketing memory prices (caused by AI boom) are adapters to use cheaper laptop memory in desktop computers.

DDR memory is used in laptops, desktops and servers, in different (DIMM) form factors; and usually unbuffered, not registered, except in servers. CUDIMM is a desktop memory (form factor) introduced for DDR5 in 2024, clocked (and unbuffered), while registered memory exist (for servers), and faster DDR5 MRDIMM; and generation 2 and 3 of MRDIMM upcoming).

DDR SDRAM typically transfers 64 bits of data at a time. Its effective transfer rate is calculated by multiplying the memory bus clock speed by two (for double data rate), then by the width of the data bus (64 bits), and dividing by eight to convert bits to bytes. For example, a DDR module with a 100 MHz bus clock has a peak transfer rate of 1600 megabytes per second (MB/s).

== History ==
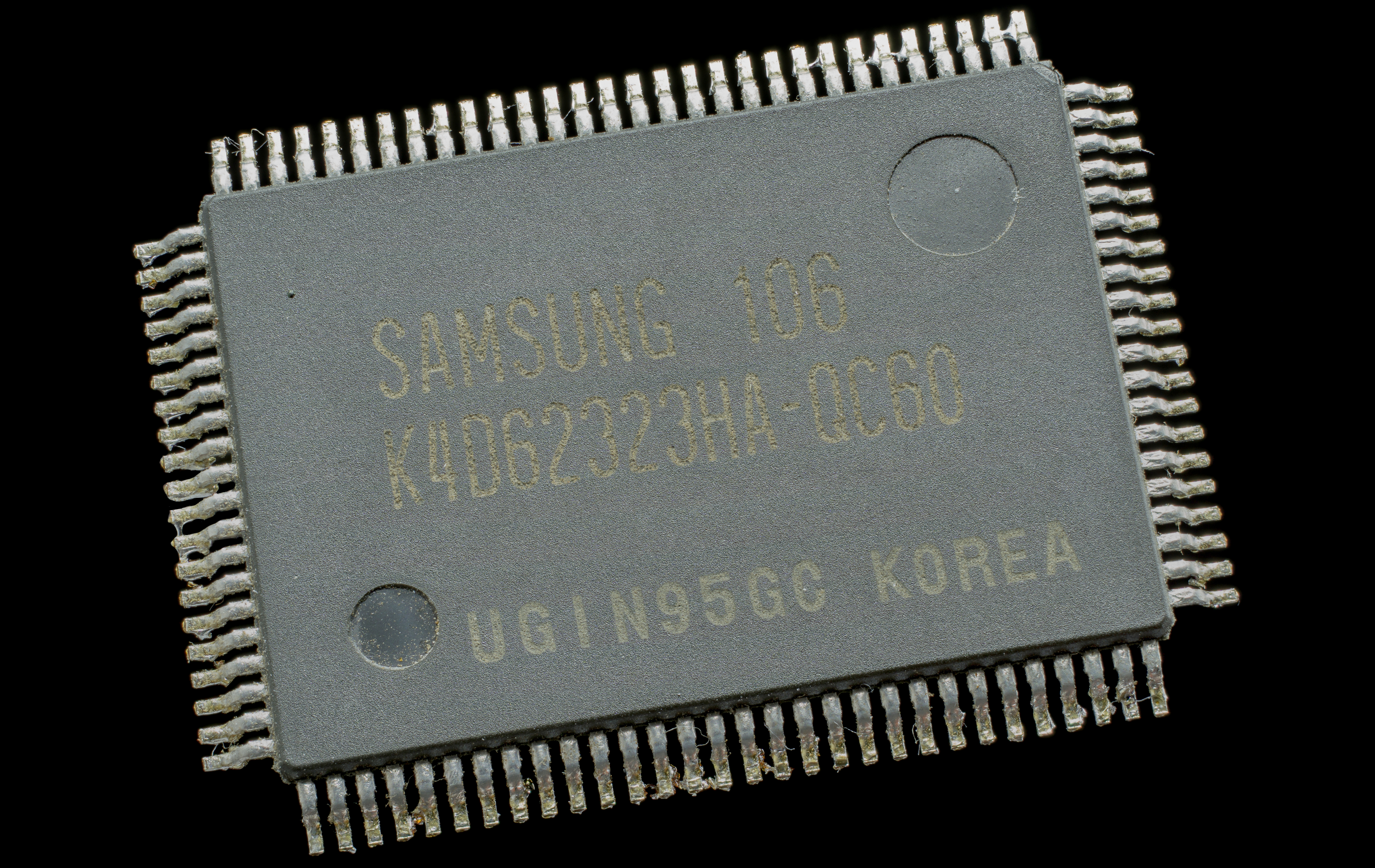
A Samsung DDR SDRAM 64 Mbit chip

In the late 1980s IBM had built DRAMs using a dual-edge clocking feature and presented their results at the International Solid-State Circuits Convention in 1990. However, it was standard DRAM, not SDRAM.

Samsung demonstrated the first DDR SDRAM memory prototype in 1997, and released the first commercial DDR SDRAM chip (64 Mbit) in June 1998, followed soon after by Hyundai Electronics (now SK Hynix) the same year. The development of DDR began in 1996, before its specification was finalized by JEDEC in June 2000 (JESD79). JEDEC has set standards for the data rates of DDR SDRAM, divided into two parts. The first specification is for memory chips, and the second is for memory modules. The first retail PC motherboard using DDR SDRAM was released in August 2000.

== Specification ==
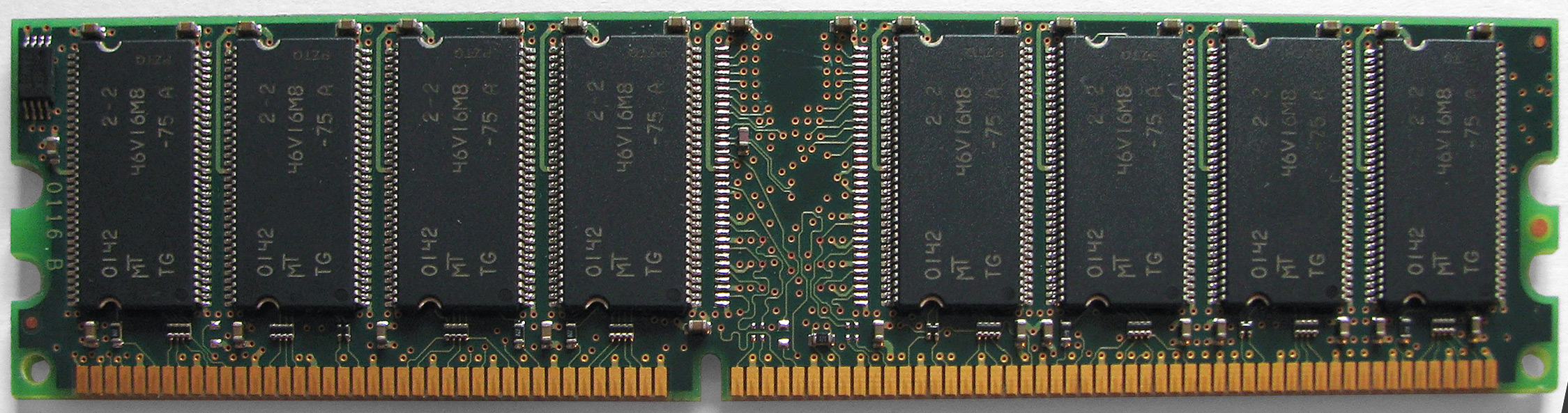
Single generic DDR memory module

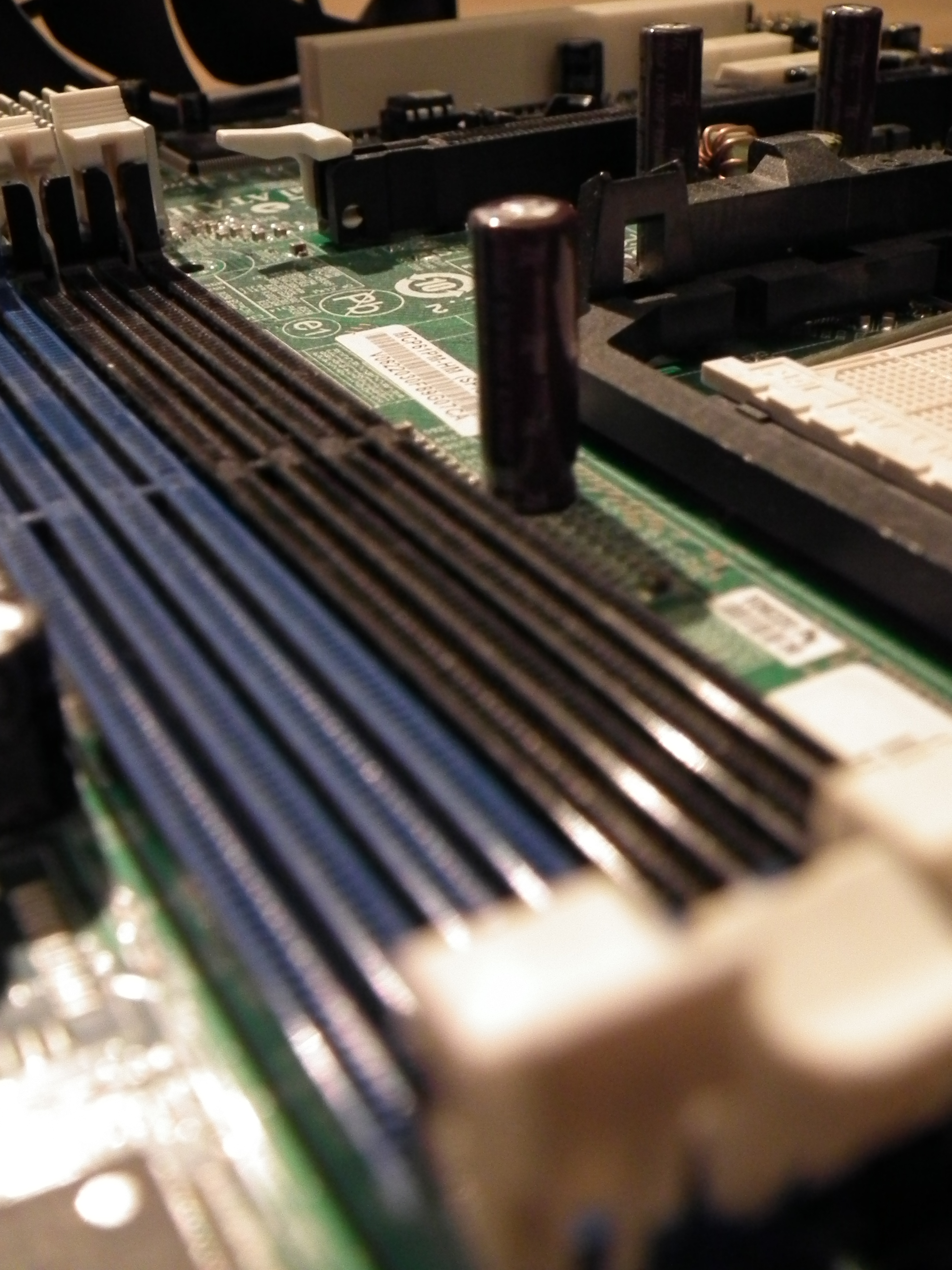
Four DDR RAM slots

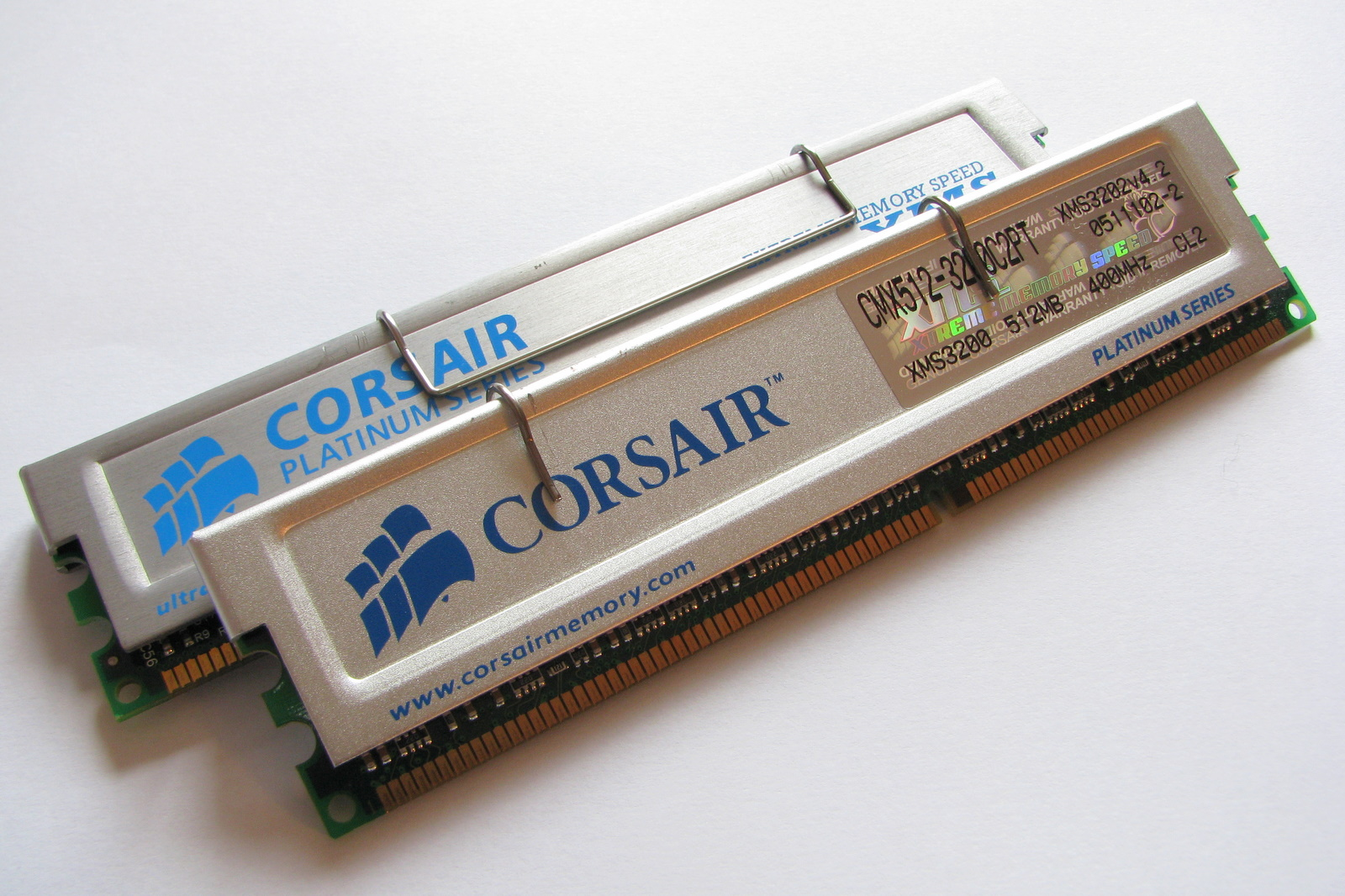
Corsair DDR-400 memory with heat spreaders

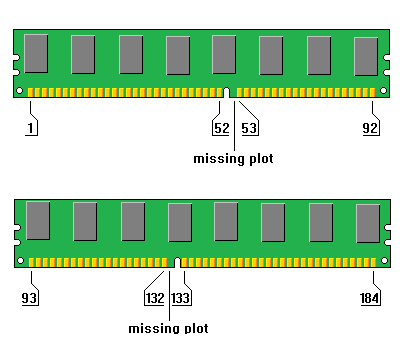
Physical DDR layout

Comparison of memory modules for portable/mobile PCs (SO-DIMM)

=== Modules ===
To increase memory capacity and bandwidth, chips are combined on a module. For instance, the 64-bit data bus for DIMM requires eight 8-bit chips, addressed in parallel. Multiple chips with common address lines are called a memory rank. The term was introduced to avoid confusion with chip internal rows and banks. A memory module may bear more than one rank. The term sides would also be confusing because it incorrectly suggests the physical placement of chips on the module. All ranks are connected to the same memory bus (address + data). The chip select signal is used to issue commands to specific rank.

Adding modules to the single memory bus creates additional electrical load on its drivers. To mitigate the resulting bus signaling rate drop and overcome the memory bottleneck, new chipsets employ the multi-channel architecture.

Comparison of DDR SDRAM standards (Note: Note: All items listed above are specified by JEDEC as JESD79F. All RAM data rates in-between or above these listed specifications are not standardized by JEDEC – often they are simply manufacturer optimizations using tighter tolerances or overvolted chips. The package sizes in which DDR SDRAM is manufactured are also standardized by JEDEC.)
Name			Chip		Bus			Timings		Voltage; (V)
Standard	Type	Module	Clock rate; (MHz)	Cycle time; (ns) (Note: Cycle time is the inverse of the I/O bus clock frequency; e.g., 1/((100 MHz)) = 10 ns per clock cycle.)	Clock rate; (MHz)	Transfer rate; (MT/s)	Bandwidth; (MB/s)	CL-T_{RCD}-T_{RP}	CAS latency; (ns)	Voltage; (V)
DDR-200		PC-1600	100	10	100	200	1600	2-2-2	20	2.5±0.2
DDR-266		PC-2100	133.33̅	7.5	133.33̅	266.66̅	2133.33̅	2.5-3-3	18.75	2.5±0.2
DDR-333		PC-2700	166.66̅	6	166.66̅	133.33̅	2666.66̅	2.5-3-3	15	2.5±0.2
DDR-400	A	PC-3200	200	5	200	400	3200	2.5-3-3	12.5	2.6±0.1
DDR-400	B	PC-3200	200	5	200	400	3200	3-3-3	15	2.6±0.1
DDR-400	C	PC-3200	200	5	200	400	3200	3-4-4	15	2.6±0.1

There is no architectural difference between DDR SDRAM modules. Modules are instead designed to run at different clock frequencies: for example, a PC-1600 module is designed to run at 100 MHz, and a PC-2100 is designed to run at 133 MHz. A module's clock speed designates the data rate at which it is guaranteed to perform, hence it is guaranteed to run at lower (underclocking) and can possibly run at higher (overclocking) clock rates than those for which it was made.

DDR SDRAM modules for desktop computers, dual in-line memory modules (DIMMs), have 184 pins (as opposed to 168 pins on SDRAM, or 240 pins on DDR2 SDRAM), and can be differentiated from SDRAM DIMMs by the number of notches (DDR SDRAM has one, SDRAM has two). DDR SDRAM for notebook computers, SO-DIMMs, have 200 pins, which is the same number of pins as DDR2 SO-DIMMs. These two specifications are notched very similarly and care must be taken during insertion if unsure of a correct match. Most DDR SDRAM operates at a voltage of 2.5 V, compared to 3.3 V for SDRAM. This can significantly reduce power consumption. Chips and modules with the DDR-400/PC-3200 standard have a nominal voltage of 2.6 V.

JEDEC Standard No. 21–C defines three possible operating voltages for 184 pin DDR, as identified by the key notch position relative to its centerline. Page 4.5.10-7 defines 2.5 V (left), 1.8 V (center), TBD (right), while page 4.20.5–40 nominates 3.3 V for the right notch position. The orientation of the module for determining the key notch position is with 52 contact positions to the left and 40 contact positions to the right.

Increasing the operating voltage slightly can increase maximum speed but at the cost of higher power dissipation and heating, and at the risk of malfunctioning or damage.

==== Capacity ====
- Number of DRAM devices
  The number of chips is a multiple of 8 for non-ECC modules and a multiple of 9 for ECC modules. Chips can occupy one side (single sided) or both sides (dual sided) of the module. The maximal number of chips per DDR module is 36 (9 × 4) for ECC and 32 (8 x 4) for non-ECC.
- ECC vs non-ECC
  Modules that have error-correcting code are labeled as ECC.
- Timings
  CAS latency (CL), clock cycle time (t_{CK}), row cycle time (t_{RC}), refresh row cycle time (t_{RFC}), row active time (t_{RAS}).
- Buffering
  Registered (or buffered) vs. unbuffered (RDIMM vs. UDIMM).
- Packaging:
  Typically DIMM or SO-DIMM.
- Power consumption
  A test with DDR and DDR2 RAM in 2005 found that average power consumption appeared to be about 1–3 W per 512 MB module; this increases with clock rate and when in use rather than idling. A manufacturer has produced calculators to estimate the power used by various types of RAM.

==== Chip layout ====
Module and chip characteristics are inherently linked.

Total module capacity is a product of one chip's capacity and the number of chips. ECC modules multiply it by 8/9 because they use 1 bit per byte (8 bits) for error correction. A module of any particular size can therefore be assembled either from 32 small chips (36 for ECC memory), or 16(18) or 8(9) bigger ones.

DDR memory bus width per channel is 64 bits (72 for ECC memory). Total module bit width is a product of bits per chip and number of chips. It also equals number of ranks (rows) multiplied by DDR memory bus width. Consequently, a module with a greater number of chips or using ×8 chips instead of ×4 will have more ranks.

Example: Variations of 1 GB PC2100 registered DDR SDRAM module with ECC
Module size	Number of chips	Chip size	Chip organization	Number of ranks
1 GB	36	256	64M×4 MBit	2
1 GB	18	512	64M×8 MBit	2
1 GB	18	512	128M×4 MBit	1

=== Chip characteristics ===
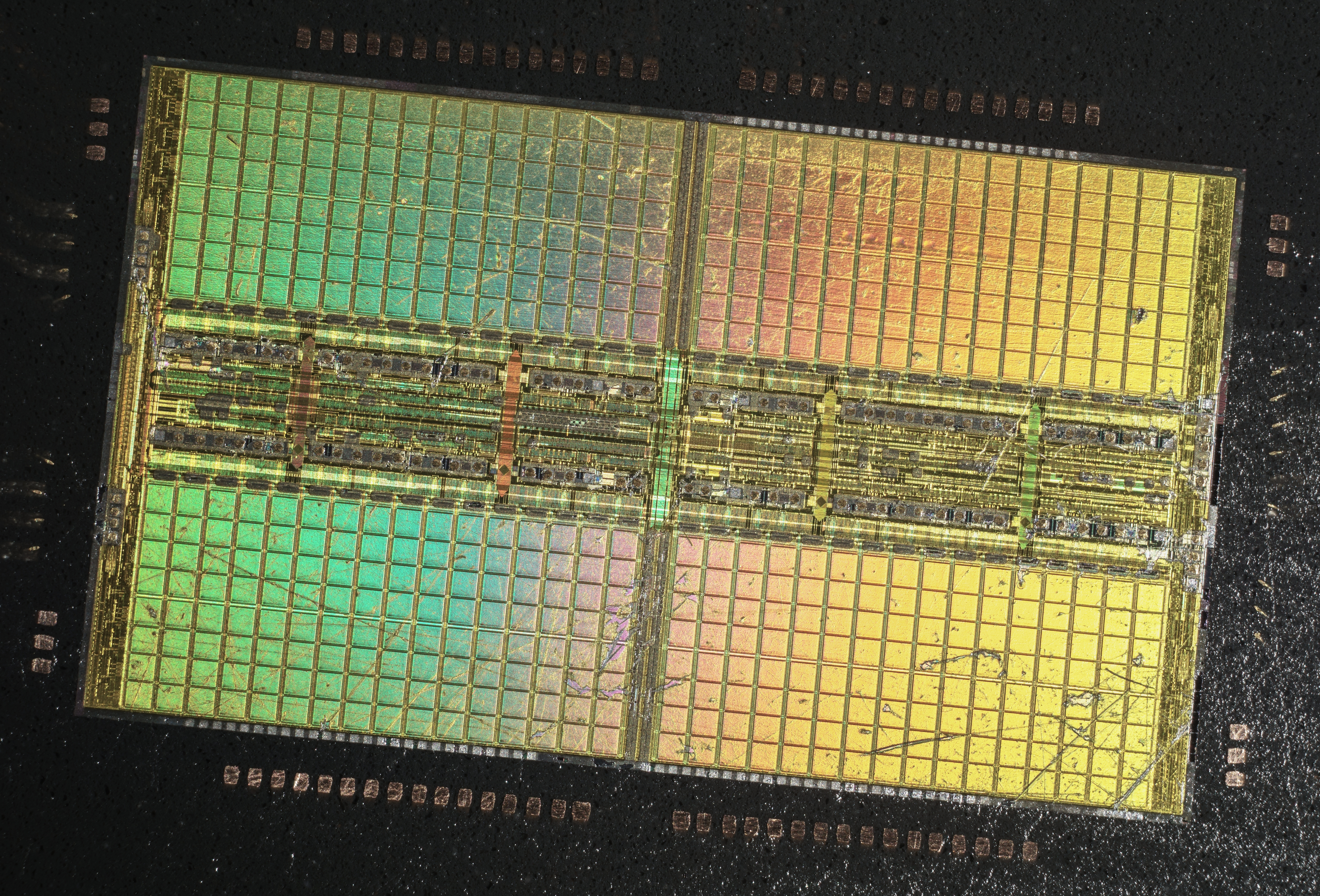
The die of a Samsung DDR-SDRAM 64MBit package

DRAM density
Size of the chip is measured in megabits. Most motherboards recognize only 1 GB modules if they contain 64M×8 chips (low density). If 128M×4 (high density) 1 GB modules are used, they most likely will not work. The JEDEC standard allows 128M×4 only for registered modules designed specifically for servers, but some generic manufacturers do not comply.
Organization
The notation like 64M×4 means that the memory matrix has 64 million (the product of banks x rows x columns) 4-bit storage locations. There are ×4, ×8, and ×16 DDR chips. The ×4 chips allow the use of advanced error correction features like Chipkill, memory scrubbing and Intel SDDC in server environments, while the ×8 and ×16 chips are somewhat less expensive. x8 chips are mainly used in desktops/notebooks but are making an entry into the server market. There are normally 4 banks and only one row can be active in each bank.

==== Double data rate (DDR) SDRAM specification ====
From Ballot JCB-99-70, and modified by numerous other Board Ballots, formulated under the cognizance of Committee JC-42.3 on DRAM Parametrics.

Standard No. 79 Revision Log:

- Release 1, June 2000
- Release 2, May 2002
- Release C, March 2003 – JEDEC Standard No. 79C.

"This comprehensive standard defines all required aspects of 64Mb through 1Gb DDR SDRAMs with X4/X8/X16 data interfaces, including features, functionality, ac and dc parametrics, packages and pin assignments. This scope will subsequently be expanded to formally apply to x32 devices, and higher density devices as well."

=== Organization ===
PC3200 is DDR SDRAM designed to operate at 200 MHz using DDR-400 chips with a bandwidth of 3,200 MB/s. Because PC3200 memory transfers data on both the rising and falling clock edges, its effective clock rate is 400 MHz.

1 GB PC3200 non-ECC modules are usually made with 16 512 Mbit chips, 8 on each side (512 Mbits × 16 chips) / (8 bits (per byte)) = 1,024 MB. The individual chips making up a 1 GB memory module are usually organized as 2^{26} 8-bit words, commonly expressed as 64M×8. Memory manufactured in this way is low-density RAM and is usually compatible with any motherboard specifying PC3200 DDR-400 memory.

== Generations ==
DDR (DDR1) was superseded by DDR2 SDRAM, which had modifications for a higher clock frequency and again doubled throughput, but operates on the same principle as DDR. Competing with DDR2 was Rambus XDR DRAM. DDR2 dominated due to cost and support factors. DDR2 was in turn superseded by DDR3 SDRAM, which offered higher performance for increased bus speeds and new features. DDR3 has been superseded by DDR4 SDRAM, which was first produced in 2011 and whose standards were still in flux (2012) with significant architectural changes.

DDR's prefetch buffer depth is 2 (bits), while DDR2 uses 4. Although the effective clock rates of DDR2 are higher than DDR, the overall performance was not greater in the early implementations, primarily due to the high latencies of the first DDR2 modules. DDR2 started to be effective by the end of 2004, as modules with lower latencies became available.

Memory manufacturers stated that it was impractical to mass produce DDR1 memory with effective transfer rates in excess of 400 MHz (i.e. 400 MT/s and 200 MHz external clock) due to internal speed limitations. DDR2 picks up where DDR1 leaves off, utilizing internal clock rates similar to DDR1, but is available at effective transfer rates of 400 MHz and higher. DDR3 advances extended the ability to preserve internal clock rates while providing higher effective transfer rates by again doubling the prefetch depth.

The DDR4 SDRAM is a high-speed dynamic random-access memory internally configured as 16 banks, 4 bank groups with 4 banks for each bank group for ×4/×8 and 8 banks, 2 bank groups with 4 banks for each bank group for ×16 DRAM. The DDR4 SDRAM uses an 8n prefetch architecture to achieve high-speed operation. The 8n prefetch architecture is combined with an interface designed to transfer two data words per clock cycle at the I/O pins. A single read or write operation for the DDR4 SDRAM consists of a single 8n-bit-wide 4-clock data transfer at the internal DRAM core and 8 corresponding n-bit-wide half-clock-cycle data transfers at the I/O pins.

RDRAM was a particularly expensive alternative to DDR SDRAM, and most manufacturers dropped its support from their chipsets. DDR1 memory's prices substantially increased from Q2 2008, while DDR2 prices declined. In January 2009, 1 GB DDR1 was 2–3 times more expensive than 1 GB DDR2.

Comparison of DDR SDRAM generations
Name		Release year	Chip			Bus			Voltage (V)	Pins		
Gen	Standard	Release year	Clock rate (MHz)	Cycle time (ns)	Pre- fetch	Clock rate (MHz)	Transfer rate (MT/s)	Bandwidth (MB/s)	Voltage (V)	DIMM	SO- DIMM	Micro- DIMM
DDR	DDR-200	1998	100	10.0	2n	100	200	1600	2.5	184	200	172
DDR	DDR-266	1998	133	7.50	2n	133	266	2133	2.5	184	200	172
DDR	DDR-333	1998	166	6.00	2n	167	333	2667	2.5	184	200	172
DDR	DDR-400	1998	200	5.00	2n	200	400	3200	2.6	184	200	172
DDR2	DDR2-400	2003	100	10.0	4n	200	400	3200	1.8	240	200	214
DDR2	DDR2-533	2003	133	7.50	4n	267	533	4267	1.8	240	200	214
DDR2	DDR2-667	2003	167	6.00	4n	333	667	5333	1.8	240	200	214
DDR2	DDR2-800	2003	200	5.00	4n	400	800	6400	1.8	240	200	214
DDR2	DDR2-1066	2003	267	3.75	4n	533	1067	8533	1.8	240	200	214
DDR3	DDR3-800	2007	100	10.0	8n	400	800	6400	1.5/1.35	240	204	214
DDR3	DDR3-1066	2007	133	7.50	8n	533	1067	8533	1.5/1.35	240	204	214
DDR3	DDR3-1333	2007	167	6.00	8n	667	1333	10600	1.5/1.35	240	204	214
DDR3	DDR3-1600	2007	200	5.00	8n	800	1600	12800	1.5/1.35	240	204	214
DDR3	DDR3-1866	2007	233	4.29	8n	933	1867	14933	1.5/1.35	240	204	214
DDR3	DDR3-2133	2007	267	3.75	8n	1067	2133	17067	1.5/1.35	240	204	214
DDR4	DDR4-1600	2014	200	5.00	8n	800	1600	12800	1.2/1.05	288	260	-
DDR4	DDR4-1866	2014	233	4.29	8n	933	1867	14933	1.2/1.05	288	260	-
DDR4	DDR4-2133	2014	267	3.75	8n	1067	2133	17067	1.2/1.05	288	260	-
DDR4	DDR4-2400	2014	300	3.33	8n	1200	2400	19200	1.2/1.05	288	260	-
DDR4	DDR4-2666	2014	333	3.00	8n	1333	2667	21333	1.2/1.05	288	260	-
DDR4	DDR4-2933	2014	367	2.73	8n	1467	2933	23467	1.2/1.05	288	260	-
DDR4	DDR4-3200	2014	400	2.50	8n	1600	3200	25600	1.2/1.05	288	260	-
DDR5	DDR5-3200	2020	200	5.00	16n	1600	3200	25600	1.1	288	262	
DDR5	DDR5-3600	2020	225	4.44	16n	1800	3600	28800	1.1	288	262	
DDR5	DDR5-4000	2020	250	4.00	16n	2000	4000	32000	1.1	288	262	
DDR5	DDR5-4800	2020	300	3.33	16n	2400	4800	38400	1.1	288	262	
DDR5	DDR5-5000	2020	312	3.20	16n	2500	5000	40000	1.1	288	262	
DDR5	DDR5-5120	2020	320	3.13	16n	2560	5120	40960	1.1	288	262	
DDR5	DDR5-5333	2020	333	3.00	16n	2667	5333	42667	1.1	288	262	
DDR5	DDR5-5600	2020	350	2.86	16n	2800	5600	44800	1.1	288	262	
DDR5	DDR5-6400	2020	400	2.50	16n	3200	6400	51200	1.1	288	262	
DDR5	DDR5-7200	2020	450	2.22	16n	3600	7200	57600	1.1	288	262	

=== LPDDR ===
LPDDR is an acronym that some enterprises use for LPDDR SDRAM, a type of memory used in some portable electronic devices, like mobile phones, handhelds, and digital audio players. Through techniques including reduced voltage supply and advanced refresh options, LPDDR can achieve greater power efficiency.

== See also ==
- ECC memory, a type of computer data storage
- Fully Buffered DIMM
- List of interface bit rates
- Serial presence detect
