= DDR6 SDRAM =

Type of random-access memory

DDR6 SDRAM Double Data Rate 6 Synchronous Dynamic Random-Access Memory
- Type of RAM
- Developer: JEDEC
- Type: Synchronous dynamic random-access memory
- Generation: 6th generation
- Standards: DDR6-9600; DDR6-17600; DDR6-21000
- Cycle time: TBA
- Transfer rate: 8.8–17.6 GT/s
- Bandwidth: Up to 134.4 GB/s
- Predecessor: DDR5 SDRAM (2020)

Double Data Rate 6 Synchronous Dynamic Random-Access Memory (DDR6 SDRAM) is the next planned type of synchronous dynamic random-access memory with a high-bandwidth ("double data rate") interface. Scheduled to release in 2028–2029, it is a type of DDR SDRAM, which will be the successor to DDR5. It will have a speed of 8700–17,600 MT/s, four 24-bit wide memory channels, and a bandwidth up to 154 GB/s. DDR6 is expected to add optional 3D DRAM support.

== Efficiency ==
It will also have CAMM2 form factor for efficiency, especially for laptops and compact devices. It will also have Decision Feedback Equalization.
