= Transfers per second =

Informal measure of rate of computer data operations

In computer technology, transfers per second, megatransfers per second (MT/s), or gigatransfers per second (GT/s) specify the number of data transfer operations per second, the transfer rate, in a data-transfer channel. This is also known as the sample rate, i.e., the number of data samples captured per second, each sample normally occurring at the clock edge. The method of physically accomplishing each data-transfer operation is not specified. They are most commonly used for the transmission of digital data. A single transfer may transmit one or more bits.

== Units ==
The bit rate or data transmission rate of a channel is the product of its transfer rate and the channel or data path width:

Channel width (bits/transfer) × transfers/second = bits/second.

For example, an 8-byte (64-bit) data bus transfers 8 bytes per transfer operation; at 1 GT/s, the data rate is 8 GB/s, equal to 64 Gbit/s.

Expanding the width of a channel, for example, that between a CPU and a northbridge, increases data throughput without requiring an increase in the channel's operating frequency (measured in transfers per second). This is analogous to increasing throughput by increasing bandwidth but leaving latency unchanged.

The units usually refer to the effective number of transfers, or transfers received from outside of a system or component, as opposed to the internal speed or rate of the clock of the system. One example is a computer bus running at double data rate where data is transferred on both the rising and falling edge of the clock signal. If its internal clock runs at 100 MHz, then the effective rate is 200 MT/s, because there are 100 million rising edges per second and 100 million falling edges per second of a clock signal running at 100 MHz.

Buses like SCSI and PCI fall in the megatransfer range of data transfer rate, while newer bus architectures like the PCI-X, PCI Express, Ultra Path, and HyperTransport operate at gigatransfer rates.

The choice of the symbol T for transfer conflicts with the International System of Units, in which T is the symbol for the tesla, a unit of magnetic flux density, so megatesla per second (MT/s) would be a reasonable unit to describe the rate of a rapidly changing magnetic field, such as in a pulsed field magnet or kicker magnet.

== See also ==
- Data-rate units
- Data transmission, also known as digital transmission
- File transfer
- Hard disk drive performance characteristics § Data transfer rate
- Parallel port
- Symbol rate (baud)
