= DDR3L-RS =

Double Data Rate 3 Low-voltage Synchronous Dynamic Random Access Memory Reduced Standby (DDR3L-RS) is a low-voltage form of DDR3 SDRAM that also has a significantly reduced standby power consumption compared to DDR3L. It is not standardized by JEDEC.

== History ==
DDR3L-RS was first introduced by Micron Technology in 2012 on a 30 nm process node under the name DDR3Lm and was targeted at ultra-thin low-power laptops. It was also produced by SK Hynix on a 20 nm process node. It was expected to reach 52% market share in laptop RAM by 2015, but actual market share figures are unknown. first used in Intel Ultrabook laptops and later became more widespread in Intel M-series, Celeron, and Atom laptops and tablets around 2019. It was used in automotive applications as well. It was mostly phased out by 2024.

=== Successor ===
DDR3L-RS was superseded by DDR4, which was standardized by JEDEC in 2012 and became popular in the mid-2010s. DDR4 offers higher transfer speeds and a lower default voltage.

== Features ==
=== Overview ===
Like DDR3L, DDR3L-RS operates at 1.35 V, but reduces standby power consumption by up to 70%. It was made in SO-DIMM and soldered form factors. Its price was competitive with LPDDR3 and supports 250 MB, 500 MB, 1 GB, 2 GB, 4 GB, and 8 GB chip densities.

=== Speeds ===
DDR3L-RS typically operates at lower speeds than DDR3L and has higher CAS latency due to its lower power consumption. It most commonly runs at 1333, 1600, or 1866 MT/s, with up to DDR3L-RS-2133 being supported.

=== Rank and ECC support ===
DDR3L-RS supports single-, dual- and quad-rank memory. It does not support ECC.
