= ODT =

The term ODT or O.D.T. can refer to several things, among them:

== Computing ==
- .ODT, the word processing file format of OpenDocument, an open standard for electronic documents
- On-line Debugging Tool, a debugger used by certain software from Digital Equipment Corporation
- Oracle Corporation's Oracle Developer Tools
- Microsoft Office's Office Deployment Tool, a command-line tool used to deploy the click-to-run versions of Office

== Media/Entertainment ==
- Otago Daily Times, New Zealand's second oldest daily newspaper
- O.D.T. (video game) (Or Die Trying), a 1998 video game created by Psygnosis for the PlayStation and PC

== Other uses ==
- Order-disorder transition
- Orally disintegrating tablet (or orally dissolving tablet), a pill that "melts" on contact with saliva
- Omnidirectional treadmill, a treadmill which can convey objects in two dimensions
- On-die termination, a technique to reduce bounce back of electrical signals on high speed electrical connections
- Dvorak technique, also known as Objective Dvorak Technique, a technique used to estimate the strength of a tropical cyclone
- Odessa-Schlemeyer Field, which has the IATA code ODT
- Olympic Discovery Trail, a multi-use trail spanning the north end of the Olympic Peninsula in Washington
