= AGESA =

Software library by AMD

AMD Generic Encapsulated Software Architecture (AGESA) is a procedure library developed by Advanced Micro Devices (AMD), used to perform the Platform Initialization (PI) on mainboards using their AMD64 architecture. As part of the BIOS of such mainboards, AGESA is responsible for the initialization of the CPU cores, chipset, main memory, and the HyperTransport controller.

== History ==
AGESA was open sourced in early 2011, aiming to aid in the development of coreboot, a project attempting to replace PC's proprietary BIOS. However, such releases never became the basis for the development of coreboot beyond AMD's Bulldozer microarchitecture, and were subsequently halted.

AGESA became particularly relevant with the AM4 platform, which AMD designed for futureproofing and served as the socket for three different generations of CPUs based on its Zen architecture. For each of these generations, a new branch of AGESA code has been released. AGESA versioning often runs separately for each of these three releases, so numbering regressions are bound to happen when going from one generation to the next.

The first version, named "Summit PI", launched in February 2017. It was targeted at the first generation Zen chips, and started with version 1.0.0.4. In October 2017, when Summit PI reached version 1.0.0.7, the branch was renamed to "Raven PI" (its version numbering was not reset), and it was released as the first version of AGESA to support Raven Ridge APUs.

The second version, supporting the Zen's second generation, known as Zen+, is named "Pinnacle PI", after the Ryzen processors' codename, Pinnacle Ridge. It launched in February 2018 with an initial version of 1.0.0.0a.

Then in March 2019, the third iteration of AGESA, named "ComboAM4 PI", was released, starting at version 0.0.7.0, introducing support for Zen 2-based processors.

"ComboAM4v2" supports Zen 3-based processors, while "ComboAM5PI" supports Zen 4-based processors in socket AM5 motherboards.

"ChagallWS PI" for the sWRX8 platform, supporting ThreadRipper Pro processors based on the Chagall architecture.

In April 2023, AMD announced plans to replace the aging AGESA codebase with a new open-source firmware called "AMD openSIL". The new firmware is expected to be ready by 2026.

== Version history ==
AGESA releases for socket AM5
Name	Microarchitecture	Version	Release Notes	Release date
ComboAM5PI	Zen 5 Zen 4	1.3.0.1f Patch A	Introduced a new memory training method and Limited Vcore to 1.4V max for select AMD Ryzen™ 8000 series CPUs.	November 2026
ComboAM5PI	Zen 5 Zen 4	1.3.0.1e	EDK II Mitigations for Transient Scheduler Attacks (AMD SB-7072, CVE-2026-18448)	October 2026
ComboAM5PI	Zen 5 Zen 4	1.3.0.1d	Security vulnerability mitigation	August 2026
ComboAM5PI	Zen 5 Zen 4	1.3.0.1c	Improve CXMT memory compatibility	July 2026
ComboAM5PI	Zen 5 Zen 4	1.3.0.1b Patch A	Support the GNR Transparent Secure Memory Encryption (TSME) feature	June 2026
ComboAM5PI	Zen 5 Zen 4	1.3.0.1b	Implemented EXPO support for Ultra Low Latency	May 2026
ComboAM5PI	Zen 5 Zen 4	1.3.0.1	Improve compatibility and performance for Ryzen 9 9950X3D2 Dual Edition processors	April 2026
ComboAM5PI	Zen 5 Zen 4	1.3.0.0a	Optimized Memory Compatibility. Resolve a boot failure occurring on certain CPUs.	February 2026
ComboAM5PI	Zen 5 Zen 4	1.2.8.0	Improved memory compatibility, added next gen Ryzen processors support	December 2025
ComboAM5PI	Zen 5 Zen 4	1.2.7.1		December 2025
ComboAM5PI	Zen 5 Zen 4	1.2.7.0	Improves compatibility with various CPUs and devices	November 2025
ComboAM5PI	Zen 5 Zen 4	1.2.0.3g		September 2025
ComboAM5PI	Zen 5 Zen 4	1.2.0.3f	Enhanced system performance, stability, device compatibility, and overclocking support	July 2025
ComboAM5PI	Zen 5 Zen 4	1.2.0.3e	256 GB (4x 64GB) RAM support, support for new CPU, security fixes (AMD-SB-4011)	June 2025
ComboAM5PI	Zen 5 Zen 4	1.2.0.3d	Enhance compatibility, optimize PBO (Precision Boost Overdrive)	June 2025
ComboAM5PI	Zen 5 Zen 4	1.2.0.3c	Security fixes (AMD-SB-7033, added “Zen5” processors as affected products)	March 2025
ComboAM5PI	Zen 5 Zen 4	1.2.0.3a Patch A	Improve compatibility of single and dual rank memory on X870 & B850 motherboards	March 2025
ComboAM5PI	Zen 5 Zen 4	1.2.0.3	Improve system performance, security fixes (CPU Microcode Signature Verification Vulnerability AMD-SB-7033)	January 2025
ComboAM5PI	Zen 5 Zen 4	1.2.0.2b	Security fixes (SMM Vulnerabilities AMD-SB-7027)	November 2024
ComboAM5PI	Zen 5 Zen 4	1.2.0.2	Reduced inter-core latency	September 2024
ComboAM5PI	Zen 5 Zen 4	1.2.0.1	Fixed security vulnerabilities (AMD-SB-7014)	August 2024
1.2.0.0a	Zen 5 Zen 4	Performance, bugfixes	June 2024	
FireRangePI	1.1.7.0 Patch A	Support for Ryzen 9000	April 2024	
ComboAM5PI	Zen 4	1.1.0.2	Fixed security vulnerabilities (AMD-SB-4008)	January 2024
ComboAM5PI	Zen 4	1.1.0.1	Fixed security vulnerabilities (LogoFAIL)	January 2024
ComboAM5PI	Zen 4	1.1.0.0	Bugfixes	December 2023
ComboAM5PI	Zen 4	1.0.9.0	Bugfixes concerning USB 3.0	November 2023
ComboAM5PI	Zen 4	1.0.8.0	Support for Phoenix, Security fixes (Inception)	October 2023
ComboAM5PI	Zen 4	1.0.0.7c	Fixes boot issues with certain RAM	August 2023
ComboAM5PI	Zen 4	1.0.0.7	Limits SoC voltage to a maximum of 1.3 volts	May 2023
ComboAM5PI	Zen 4	1.0.0.6	Bugfixes	April 2023
ComboAM5PI	Zen 4	1.0.0.5 Patch C	Support for Ryzen 7000X3D	March 2023
ComboAM5PI	Zen 4	1.0.0.4	Support for Ryzen 7000 with 65 Watt	January 2023
ComboAM5PI	Zen 4	1.0.0.3 Patch A	Improved GPU compatibility for GeForce RTX 40 series, Optimize for AMD Ryzen Master Utility	September 2022
ComboAM5PI	Zen 4	1.0.0.3	Optimized system settings	September 2022
ComboAM5PI	Zen 4	1.0.0.2	Optimized system stability	September 2022
ComboAM5PI	Zen 4	1.0.0.1 Patch H	Improved RAM-compatibility	September 2022

AGESA releases for socket sWRX8
Name	Microarchitecture	Version	Release Notes	Release date
ChagallWSPI	Zen 3	1.0.0.C		July 2025
ChagallWSPI	Zen 3	1.0.0.B	AMD-SB-7033	December 2024
ChagallWSPI	Zen 3	1.0.0.7	AMD-SB-7009	January 2024
CastlePeakWSPI	Zen 2	1.0.0.G	AMD-SB-7033	December 2024
CastlePeakWSPI	Zen 2	1.0.0.C	AMD-SB-7009	November 2023

AGESA releases for socket AM4
Name	Microarchitecture	Version	Notes	Date
Combo-AM4v2	Zen 3 Zen 2 Zen+ Zen	1.2.0.13	Security fixes (CVE-2026-18448, CVE-2026-43613)	November 2026
Combo-AM4v2	Zen 3 Zen 2 Zen+ Zen	1.2.0.12	Security fixes (CVE-2026-6726, CVE-2026-6727, AMD-SB-7064)	May 2026
Combo-AM4v2	Zen 3 Zen 2 Zen+ Zen	1.2.0.11	Fix AMD Athlon and Ryzen processor vulnerabilities	April 2026
Combo-AM4v2	Zen 3 Zen 2 Zen+ Zen	1.2.0.10	Security fixes (CVE-2024-36355, CVE-2025-54502, CVE-2025-54518, AMD-SB-4013)	October 2025
Combo-AM4v2	Zen 3 Zen 2 Zen+ Zen	1.2.0.F	Security fixes (CVE-2025-29949)	July 2025
Combo-AM4v2	Zen 3 Zen 2 Zen+ Zen	1.2.0.E	Security fixes (CPU Microcode Signature Verification Vulnerability AMD-SB-7033)	January 2025
Combo-AM4v2	Zen 3 Zen 2 Zen+ Zen	1.2.0.D	Security fixes (SMM Vulnerabilities AMD-SB-7027)	November 2024
Combo-AM4v2	Zen 3 Zen 2 Zen+ Zen	1.2.0.Cc	Security fixes (Sinkclose/SMM Lock Bypass) in Ryzen 3000	September 2024
Combo-AM4v2	Zen 3 Zen 2 Zen+ Zen	1.2.0.Cb	Security fixes (Sinkclose/SMM Lock Bypass AMD-SB-7014) in Ryzen 4000/5000	August 2024
Combo-AM4v2	Zen 3 Zen 2 Zen+ Zen	1.2.0.Ca	Security fixes for Ryzen 4000G Renoir (AMD-SB-7008, AMD-SB-4008)	April 2024
Combo-AM4v2	Zen 3 Zen 2 Zen+ Zen	1.2.0.C	Security fixes (LogoFAIL)	March 2024
Combo-AM4v2	Zen 3 Zen 2 Zen+ Zen	1.2.0.B	Security fixes (Inception)	September 2023
Combo-AM4v2	Zen 3 Zen 2 Zen+ Zen	1.2.0.A	Security fixes	April 2023
Combo-AM4v2	Zen 3 Zen 2 Zen+ Zen	1.2.0.8	Security fixes for Ryzen 5000 Cezanne	January 2023
Combo-AM4v2	Zen 3 Zen 2 Zen+ Zen	1.2.0.7	Support for Cezanne with 300 chipset	April 2022
Combo-AM4v2	Zen 3 Zen 2 Zen+ Zen	1.2.0.6b	Support for Ryzen 5800X3D	March 2022
Combo-AM4v2	Zen 3 Zen 2 Zen+ Zen	1.2.0.5	Stability fixes	December 2021
Combo-AM4v2	Zen 3 Zen 2 Zen+ Zen	1.2.0.3c	Support for Ryzen 5000 Vermeer, Ryzen 4000G Renoir with 300 chipset	October 2021
Combo-AM4v2	Zen 3 Zen 2 Zen+ Zen	1.2.0.2	Stability fixes	March 2021
Combo-AM4v2	Zen 3 Zen 2 Zen+ Zen	1.2.0.1	Stability fixes	February 2021
Combo-AM4v2	Zen 3 Zen 2 Zen+ Zen	1.2.0.0	Support for Vermeer, Renoir, Cezanne with 400 chipset	January 2021
Combo-AM4v2	Zen 3 Zen 2 Zen+ Zen	1.1.9.0	Curve Optimizer for undervolting and overclocking	January 2021
Combo-AM4v2	Zen 3 Zen 2 Zen+ Zen	1.1.0.0d	Support for 400 chipset	December 2020
Combo-AM4v2	Zen 3 Zen 2 Zen+ Zen	1.1.0.0c	Stability fixes	November 2020
Combo-AM4v2	Zen 3 Zen 2 Zen+ Zen	1.1.0.0	Stability fixes	September 2020
Combo-AM4v2	Zen 3 Zen 2 Zen+ Zen	1.0.8.1	Stability fixes	September 2020
Combo-AM4v2	Zen 3 Zen 2 Zen+ Zen	1.0.8.0	Support for Vermeer with 500 chipset	August 2020
1.0.0.2	Support for B550 chipset, Ryzen 3000 Matisse XT, Renoir	June 2020		
Combo-AM4	Zen 2 Zen+ Zen (Excavator)	1.0.0.6	Stability fixes	June 2020
Combo-AM4	Zen 2 Zen+ Zen (Excavator)	1.0.0.5	Stability fixes	April 2020
Combo-AM4	Zen 2 Zen+ Zen (Excavator)	1.0.0.4b	Support for Ryzen 9 3950X, Zen und Zen+	November 2019
Combo-AM4	Zen 2 Zen+ Zen (Excavator)	1.0.0.3abba	Stability fixes	September 2019
Combo-AM4	Zen 2 Zen+ Zen (Excavator)	1.0.0.3abb	Stability fixes	August 2019
Combo-AM4	Zen 2 Zen+ Zen (Excavator)	1.0.0.3aba	Stability fixes	
Combo-AM4	Zen 2 Zen+ Zen (Excavator)	1.0.0.3ab	Stability fixes	
Combo-AM4	Zen 2 Zen+ Zen (Excavator)	1.0.0.3a	Stability fixes	
Combo-AM4	Zen 2 Zen+ Zen (Excavator)	1.0.0.3	Stability fixes	
Combo-AM4	Zen 2 Zen+ Zen (Excavator)	1.0.0.2	Stability fixes	
Combo-AM4	Zen 2 Zen+ Zen (Excavator)	1.0.0.1	Full support for Matisse	
Combo-AM4	Zen 2 Zen+ Zen (Excavator)	0.0.7.2	Support for Ryzen 3000G Picasso, preliminary support for Matisse	March 2019
PinnaclePI-AM4	Zen+ Zen Excavator	1.0.0.6		December 2018
PinnaclePI-AM4	Zen+ Zen Excavator	1.0.0.4		August 2018
PinnaclePI-AM4	Zen+ Zen Excavator	1.0.0.2a		June 2018
PinnaclePI-AM4	Zen+ Zen Excavator	1.0.0.2		June 2018
PinnaclePI-AM4	Zen+ Zen Excavator	1.0.0.1a		March 2018
SummitPI-AM4	Zen Excavator	1.0.0.6b		September 2017
SummitPI-AM4	Zen Excavator	1.0.0.6a		July 2017
SummitPI-AM4	Zen Excavator	1.0.0.6	Support for DDR4 SDRAM up to 4000 MT/s	May 2017
SummitPI-AM4	Zen Excavator	1.0.0.4a		April 2017

== See also ==
- Bootstrapping (computing)
- Coreboot
- Memory Reference Code
