= DDR3 SDRAM =

Third generation of double-data-rate synchronous dynamic random-access memory

DDR3 SDRAM Double Data Rate 3 Synchronous Dynamic Random-Access Memory
- Type of RAM
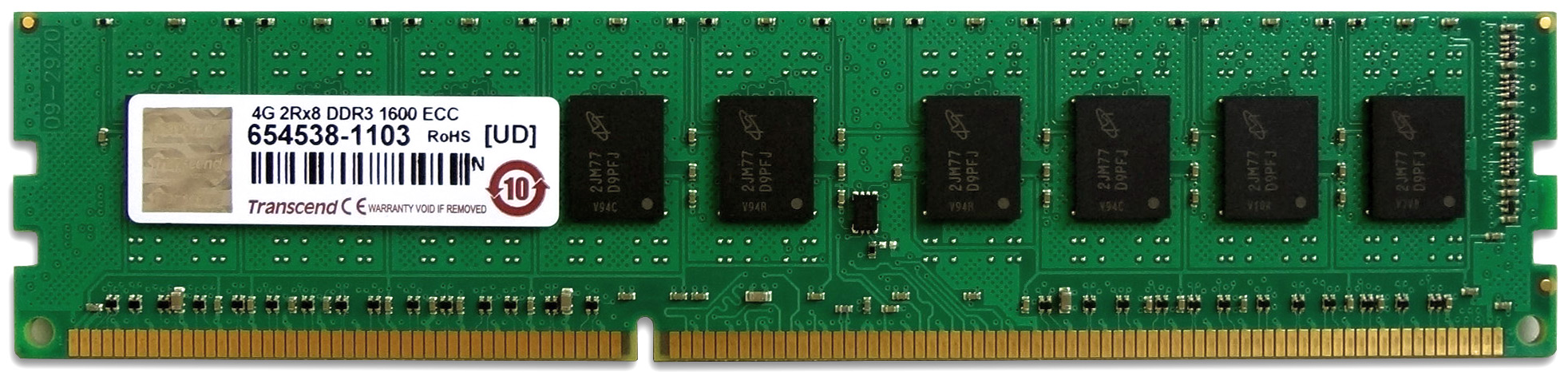
- 4 GB PC3-12800 ECC DDR3 DIMM
- Developer: JEDEC
- Type: Synchronous dynamic random-access memory (SDRAM)
- Generation: 3rd generation
- Release date: 2007; 19 years ago
- Standards: DDR3-800 (PC3-6400); DDR3-1066 (PC3-8500); DDR3-1333 (PC3-10600); DDR3-1600 (PC3-12800); DDR3-1866 (PC3-14900); DDR3-2133 (PC3-17000)
- Clock rate: 400–1066 MHz
- Transfer rate: 800 MT/s to 2133 MT/s
- Bandwidth: 6.4 GB/s to 17.0 GB/s
- Voltage: Reference 1.5 V, 1.35V (DDR3L)
- Predecessor: DDR2 SDRAM (2003)
- Successor: DDR4 SDRAM (2014)

Double Data Rate 3 Synchronous Dynamic Random-Access Memory (DDR3 SDRAM) is a type of synchronous dynamic random-access memory (SDRAM) with a high-bandwidth ("double data rate") interface, that was released in 2007. It is the higher-speed successor to DDR and DDR2 and predecessor to DDR4 synchronous dynamic random-access memory (SDRAM) chips. DDR3 SDRAM is neither forward nor backward compatible with any earlier type of random-access memory (RAM) because of different signaling voltages, timings, and other factors.

DDR3 is a DRAM interface specification. The actual DRAM arrays that store the data are similar to earlier types, with similar performance. The primary benefit of DDR3 SDRAM over its immediate predecessor DDR2 SDRAM, is its ability to transfer data at twice the rate (eight times the speed of its internal memory arrays), enabling higher bandwidth or peak data rates.

The DDR3 standard permits DRAM chip capacities of up to 8 gigabits (Gbit) (so 1 gigabyte by DRAM chip), and up to four ranks of 64 Gbit each for a total maximum of 16 gigabytes (GB) per DDR3 DIMM. Because of a hardware limitation not fixed until Ivy Bridge-E in 2013, most older Intel CPUs only support up to 4-Gbit chips for 8 GB DIMMs (Intel's Core 2 DDR3 chipsets only support up to 2 Gbit). All AMD CPUs correctly support the full specification for 16 GB DDR3 DIMMs. (also named as "AMD Only" memory, because of using 11-bit addressing).

== History ==
In February 2005, Samsung introduced the first prototype DDR3 memory chip. Samsung played a major role in the development and standardisation of DDR3. In May 2005, Desi Rhoden, chairman of the JEDEC committee, stated that DDR3 had been under development for "about 3 years".

DDR3 was officially launched in 2007, but sales were not expected to overtake DDR2 until the end of 2009 or possibly early 2010, according to Intel strategist Carlos Weissenberg, speaking during the early part of their roll-out in August 2008. (The same timescale for market penetration had been stated by market intelligence company DRAMeXchange over a year earlier in April 2007, and by Desi Rhoden in 2005.) The primary driving force behind the increased usage of DDR3 has been new Core i7 processors from Intel and Phenom II processors from AMD, both of which have internal memory controllers: the former requires DDR3, the latter recommends it. IDC stated in January 2009 that DDR3 sales would account for 29% of the total DRAM units sold in 2009, rising to 72% by 2011.

=== Successor ===
In September 2012, JEDEC released the final specification of DDR4. The primary benefits of DDR4 compared to DDR3 include a higher standardized range of clock frequencies and data transfer rates and significantly lower voltage.

== Specification ==
=== Overview ===
Physical comparison of DDR, DDR2, and DDR3 SDRAM

Desktop PCs (DIMM)

Notebook and convertible PCs (SO-DIMM)

Compared to DDR2 memory, DDR3 memory uses less power. Some manufacturers further propose using "dual-gate" transistors to reduce leakage of current.

According to JEDEC, 1.575 volts should be considered the absolute maximum when memory stability is the foremost consideration, such as in servers or other mission-critical devices. In addition, JEDEC states that memory modules must withstand up to 1.80 volts (Note: Prior to revision F, the standard stated that 1.975 V was the absolute maximum DC rating.) before incurring permanent damage, although they are not required to function correctly at that level.

Another benefit is its prefetch buffer, which is 8-burst-deep. In contrast, the prefetch buffer of DDR2 is 4-burst-deep, and the prefetch buffer of DDR is 2-burst-deep. This advantage is an enabling technology in DDR3's transfer speed.

DDR3 modules can transfer data at a rate of 800–2133 MT/s using both rising and falling edges of a 400–1066 MHz I/O clock. This is twice DDR2's data transfer rates (400–1066 MT/s using a 200–533 MHz I/O clock) and four times the rate of DDR (200–400 MT/s using a 100–200 MHz I/O clock). High-performance graphics was an initial driver of such bandwidth requirements, where high bandwidth data transfer between framebuffers is required.

Because the hertz is a measure of cycles per second, and no signal cycles more often than every other transfer, describing the transfer rate in units of MHz is technically incorrect, although very common. It is also misleading because various memory timings are given in units of clock cycles, which are half the speed of data transfers.

DDR3 does use the same electric signaling standard as DDR and DDR2, Stub Series Terminated Logic, albeit at different timings and voltages. Specifically, DDR3 uses SSTL_15.

In February 2005, Samsung demonstrated the first DDR3 memory prototype, with a capacity of 512 Mb and a bandwidth of 1.066 Gbps. Products in the form of motherboards appeared on the market in June 2007 based on Intel's P35 "Bearlake" chipset with DIMMs at bandwidths up to DDR3-1600 (PC3-12800). The Intel Core i7, released in November 2008, connects directly to memory rather than via a chipset. The Core i7, i5 & i3 CPUs initially supported only DDR3. AMD's socket AM3 Phenom II X4 processors, released in February 2009, were their first to support DDR3 (while still supporting DDR2 for backwards compatibility).

=== Dual-inline memory modules ===
DDR3 dual-inline memory modules (DIMMs) have 240 pins and are electrically incompatible with DDR2. A key notch—located differently in DDR2 and DDR3 DIMMs—prevents accidentally interchanging them. Not only are they keyed differently, but DDR2 has rounded notches on the side and the DDR3 modules have square notches on the side. DDR3 SO-DIMMs have 204 pins.

For the Skylake microarchitecture, Intel has also designed a SO-DIMM package named UniDIMM, which can use either DDR3 or DDR4 chips. The CPU's integrated memory controller can then work with either. The purpose of UniDIMMs is to handle the transition from DDR3 to DDR4, where pricing and availability may make it desirable to switch RAM type. UniDIMMs have the same dimensions and number of pins as regular DDR4 SO-DIMMs, but the notch is placed differently to avoid accidentally using in an incompatible DDR4 SO-DIMM socket.

=== Latencies ===
DDR3 latencies are numerically higher because the I/O bus clock cycles by which they are measured are shorter; the actual time interval is similar to DDR2 latencies, around 10 ns. There is some improvement because DDR3 generally uses more recent manufacturing processes, but this is not directly caused by the change to DDR3.

CAS latency (ns) = 1000 × CL (cycles) ÷ clock frequency (MHz) = 2000 × CL (cycles) ÷ transfer rate (MT/s)

While the typical latencies for a JEDEC DDR2-800 device were 5-5-5-15 (12.5 ns), some standard latencies for JEDEC DDR3 devices include 7-7-7-20 for DDR3-1066 (13.125 ns) and 8-8-8-24 for DDR3-1333 (12 ns).

As with earlier memory generations, faster DDR3 memory became available after the release of the initial versions. DDR3-2000 memory with 9-9-9-28 latency (9 ns) was available in time to coincide with the Intel Core i7 release in late 2008, while later developments made DDR3-2400 widely available (with CL 9–12 cycles = 7.5–10 ns), and speeds up to DDR3-3200 available (with CL 13 cycles = 8.125 ns).

=== Power consumption ===
Power consumption of individual SDRAM chips (or, by extension, DIMMs) varies based on many factors, including speed, type of usage, voltage, etc. Dell's Power Advisor calculates that 4 GB ECC DDR1333 RDIMMs use about 4 W each. By contrast, a more modern mainstream desktop-oriented part 8 GB, DDR3/1600 DIMM, is rated at 2.58 W, despite being significantly faster.

=== Modules ===
List of standard DDR3 SDRAM modules
| Name | | | Chip | | Bus | | | Timings | |
| Standard | Type | Module | Clock rate (MHz) | Cycle time (ns) | Clock rate (MHz) | Transfer rate (MT/s) | Bandwidth (MB/s) | CL-T_{RCD}-T_{RP} | CAS latency (ns) |
|---|---|---|---|---|---|---|---|---|---|
| DDR3-800 | D | PC3-6400 | 100 | 10.0 | 400 | 800 | 6400 | 5-5-5 | 12.5 |
| DDR3-800 | E | PC3-6400 | 100 | 10.0 | 400 | 800 | 6400 | 6-6-6 | 15 |
| DDR3-1066 | E | PC3-8500 | 133 | 7.50 | 533 | 1067 | 8533 | 6-6-6 | 11.25 |
| DDR3-1066 | F | PC3-8500 | 133 | 7.50 | 533 | 1067 | 8533 | 7-7-7 | 13.125 |
| DDR3-1066 | G | PC3-8500 | 133 | 7.50 | 533 | 1067 | 8533 | 8-8-8 | 15 |
| DDR3-1333 | F* | PC3-10600 | 167 | 6.00 | 667 | 1333 | 10667 | 7-7-7 | 10.5 |
| DDR3-1333 | G | PC3-10600 | 167 | 6.00 | 667 | 1333 | 10667 | 8-8-8 | 12 |
| DDR3-1333 | H | PC3-10600 | 167 | 6.00 | 667 | 1333 | 10667 | 9-9-9 | 13.5 |
| DDR3-1333 | J* | PC3-10600 | 167 | 6.00 | 667 | 1333 | 10667 | 10-10-10 | 15 |
| DDR3-1600 | G* | PC3-12800 | 200 | 5.00 | 800 | 1600 | 12800 | 8-8-8 | 10 |
| DDR3-1600 | H | PC3-12800 | 200 | 5.00 | 800 | 1600 | 12800 | 9-9-9 | 11.25 |
| DDR3-1600 | J | PC3-12800 | 200 | 5.00 | 800 | 1600 | 12800 | 10-10-10 | 12.5 |
| DDR3-1600 | K | PC3-12800 | 200 | 5.00 | 800 | 1600 | 12800 | 11-11-11 | 13.75 |
| DDR3-1866 | J* | PC3-14900 | 233 | 4.29 | 933 | 1867 | 14933 | 10-10-10 | 10.56 |
| DDR3-1866 | K | PC3-14900 | 233 | 4.29 | 933 | 1867 | 14933 | 11-11-11 | 11.786 |
| DDR3-1866 | L | PC3-14900 | 233 | 4.29 | 933 | 1867 | 14933 | 12-12-12 | 12.857 |
| DDR3-1866 | M* | PC3-14900 | 233 | 4.29 | 933 | 1867 | 14933 | 13-13-13 | 13.929 |
| DDR3-2133 | K* | PC3-17000 | 267 | 3.75 | 1067 | 2133 | 17067 | 11-11-11 | 10.313 |
| DDR3-2133 | L | PC3-17000 | 267 | 3.75 | 1067 | 2133 | 17067 | 12-12-12 | 11.25 |
| DDR3-2133 | M | PC3-17000 | 267 | 3.75 | 1067 | 2133 | 17067 | 13-13-13 | 12.188 |
| DDR3-2133 | N* | PC3-17000 | 267 | 3.75 | 1067 | 2133 | 17067 | 14-14-14 | 13.125 |

* optional

DDR3-xxx denotes data transfer rate, and describes DDR chips, whereas PC3-xxxx denotes theoretical bandwidth (with the last two digits truncated), and is used to describe assembled DIMMs. Bandwidth is calculated by taking transfers per second and multiplying by eight. This is because DDR3 memory modules transfer data on a bus that is 64 data bits wide, and since a byte comprises 8 bits, this equates to 8 bytes of data per transfer.

With two transfers per cycle of a quadrupled clock signal, a 64-bit wide DDR3 module may achieve a transfer rate of up to 64 times the memory clock speed. With data being transferred 64 bits at a time per memory module, DDR3 SDRAM gives a transfer rate of (memory clock rate) × 4 (for bus clock multiplier) × 2 (for data rate) × 64 (number of bits transferred) / 8 (number of bits in a byte). Thus with a memory clock frequency of 100 MHz, DDR3 SDRAM gives a maximum transfer rate of 6400 MB/s.

The data rate (in MT/s) is twice the I/O bus clock (in MHz) due to the double data rate of DDR memory. As explained above, the bandwidth in MB/s is the data rate multiplied by eight.

CL – CAS Latency clock cycles, between sending a column address to the memory and the beginning of the data in response

tRCD – Clock cycles between row activate and reads/writes

tRP – Clock cycles between row precharge and activate

Fractional frequencies are normally rounded down, but rounding up to 667 is common because of the exact number being 666 2/3 and rounding to the nearest whole number. Some manufacturers also round to a certain precision or round up instead. For example, PC3-10666 memory could be listed as PC3-10600 or PC3-10700.

Note: All items listed above are specified by JEDEC as JESD79-3F.All RAM data rates in-between or above these listed specifications are not standardized by JEDEC—often they are simply manufacturer optimizations using higher-tolerance or overvolted chips. Of these non-standard specifications, the highest speeds would reach up to DDR3-3200.

Alternative naming: DDR3 modules are often incorrectly labeled with the prefix PC (instead of PC3), for marketing reasons, followed by the data-rate. Under this convention PC3-10600 is listed as PC1333.

=== Serial presence detect ===
DDR3 memory utilizes serial presence detect. Serial presence detect (SPD) is a standardized way to automatically access information about a computer memory module, using a serial interface. It is typically used during the power-on self-test for automatic configuration of memory modules.

==== Release 4 ====
Release 4 of the DDR3 Serial Presence Detect (SPD) document (SPD4_01_02_11) adds support for Load Reduction DIMMs and also for 16b-SO-DIMMs and 32b-SO-DIMMs.

JEDEC Solid State Technology Association announced the publication of Release 4 of the DDR3 Serial Presence Detect (SPD) document on September 1, 2011.

==== XMP extension ====
Intel Corporation officially introduced the eXtreme Memory Profile (XMP) Specification on March 23, 2007, to enable enthusiast performance extensions to the traditional JEDEC SPD specifications for DDR3 SDRAM.

== Variants ==
In addition to bandwidth designations (e.g. DDR3-800D), and capacity variants, modules can be one of the following:

1. ECC memory, which has an extra data byte lane used for correcting minor errors and detecting major errors for better reliability. Modules with ECC are identified by an additional ECC or E in their designation. For example: "PC3-6400 ECC", or PC3-8500E.
2. Registered or buffered memory, which improves signal integrity (and hence potentially clock rates and physical slot capacity) by electrically buffering the signals with a register, at a cost of an extra clock of increased latency. Those modules are identified by an additional R in their designation, for example PC3-6400R.
3. Non-registered (a.k.a. "unbuffered") RAM may be identified by an additional U in the designation.
4. Load reduced modules, which are designated by LR and are similar to registered/buffered memory, in a way that LRDIMM modules buffer both control and data lines while retaining the parallel nature of all signals. As such, LRDIMM memory provides large overall maximum memory capacities, while addressing some of the performance and power consumption issues of FB memory induced by the required conversion between serial and parallel signal forms.

Both FBDIMM (fully buffered) and LRDIMM (load reduced) memory types are designed primarily to control the amount of electric current flowing to and from the memory chips at any given time. They are not compatible with registered/buffered memory, and motherboards that require them usually will not accept any other kind of memory.

=== DDR3L and DDR3U extensions ===
The DDR3L (DDR3 Low Voltage) standard is an addendum to the JESD79-3 DDR3 Memory Device Standard specifying low voltage devices. The DDR3L standard is 1.35 V and has the label PC3L for its modules. Examples include DDR3L‐800 (PC3L-6400), DDR3L‐1066 (PC3L-8500), DDR3L‐1333 (PC3L-10600), and DDR3L‐1600 (PC3L-12800). Memory specified to DDR3L and DDR3U specifications is compatible with the original DDR3 standard, and can run at either the lower voltage or at 1.50 V. However, devices that require DDR3L explicitly, which operate at 1.35 V, such as systems using mobile versions of fourth-generation Intel Core processors, are not compatible with 1.50 V DDR3 memory. DDR3L is different from and incompatible with the LPDDR3 mobile memory standard.

The DDR3U (DDR3 Ultra Low Voltage) standard is 1.25 V and has the label PC3U for its modules.

JEDEC Solid State Technology Association announced the publication of JEDEC DDR3L on July 26, 2010 and the DDR3U in October 2011.

== Feature summary ==
=== Components ===
- Introduction of asynchronous RESET pin
- Support of system-level flight-time compensation
- On-DIMM mirror-friendly DRAM pinout
- Introduction of CWL (CAS write latency) per clock bin
- On-die I/O calibration engine
- READ and WRITE calibration
- Dynamic ODT (On-Die-Termination) feature allows different termination values for Reads and Writes

=== Modules ===
- Fly-by command/address/control bus with on-DIMM termination
- High-precision calibration resistors
- Are not backwards compatible—DDR3 modules do not fit into DDR2 sockets; forcing them can damage the DIMM and/or the motherboard

=== Technological advantages over DDR2 ===
- Higher bandwidth performance, up to 2133 MT/s standardized
- Slightly improved latencies, as measured in nanoseconds
- Higher performance at low power (longer battery life in laptops)
- Enhanced low-power features

== See also ==
- List of interface bit rates
- Low power DDR3 SDRAM (LPDDR3)
- Multi-channel memory architecture
