= GO64 =

Software emulation of the Commodore 64

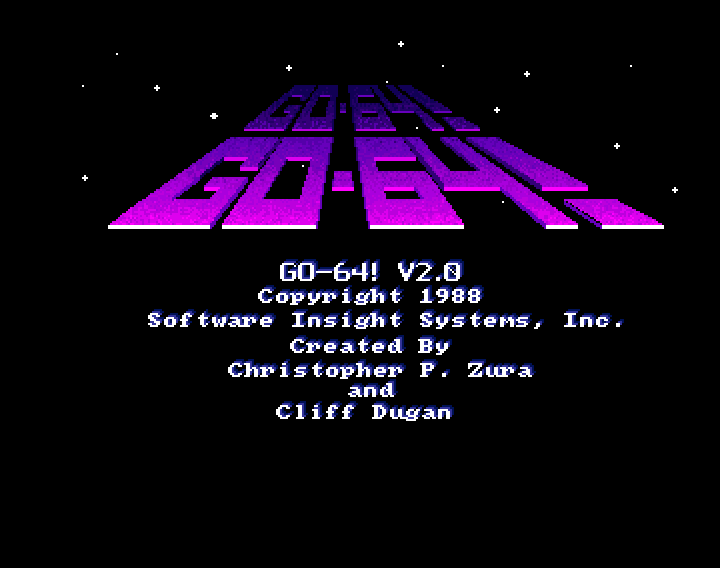
The screen shown while the Go-64! version 2.0 Commodore 64 emulator software loads from storage media on an Amiga computer.

GO-64! was an early software emulation of the Commodore 64 computer for Amiga computers. GO-64! was created by Christopher P. Zura and Cliff Dugan of Software Insight Systems Inc. It required a minimum of 512KB of RAM to operate, but 1 MB of RAM was recommended. If a 68020 CPU was installed, it could operate at speeds exceeding the speed of a real Commodore 64, according to the developers. This software does not operate on versions later than 1.3 of the Amiga Kickstart, and so does not operate on the Amiga 3000, Amiga 500 Plus, Amiga 600, Amiga 4000 or Amiga 1200. Several reviewers noted that it ran substantially slower compared to the actual Commodore 64.
