= Amiga 3000T =

Computer manufacutered by Commodore

Commodore Amiga 3000T
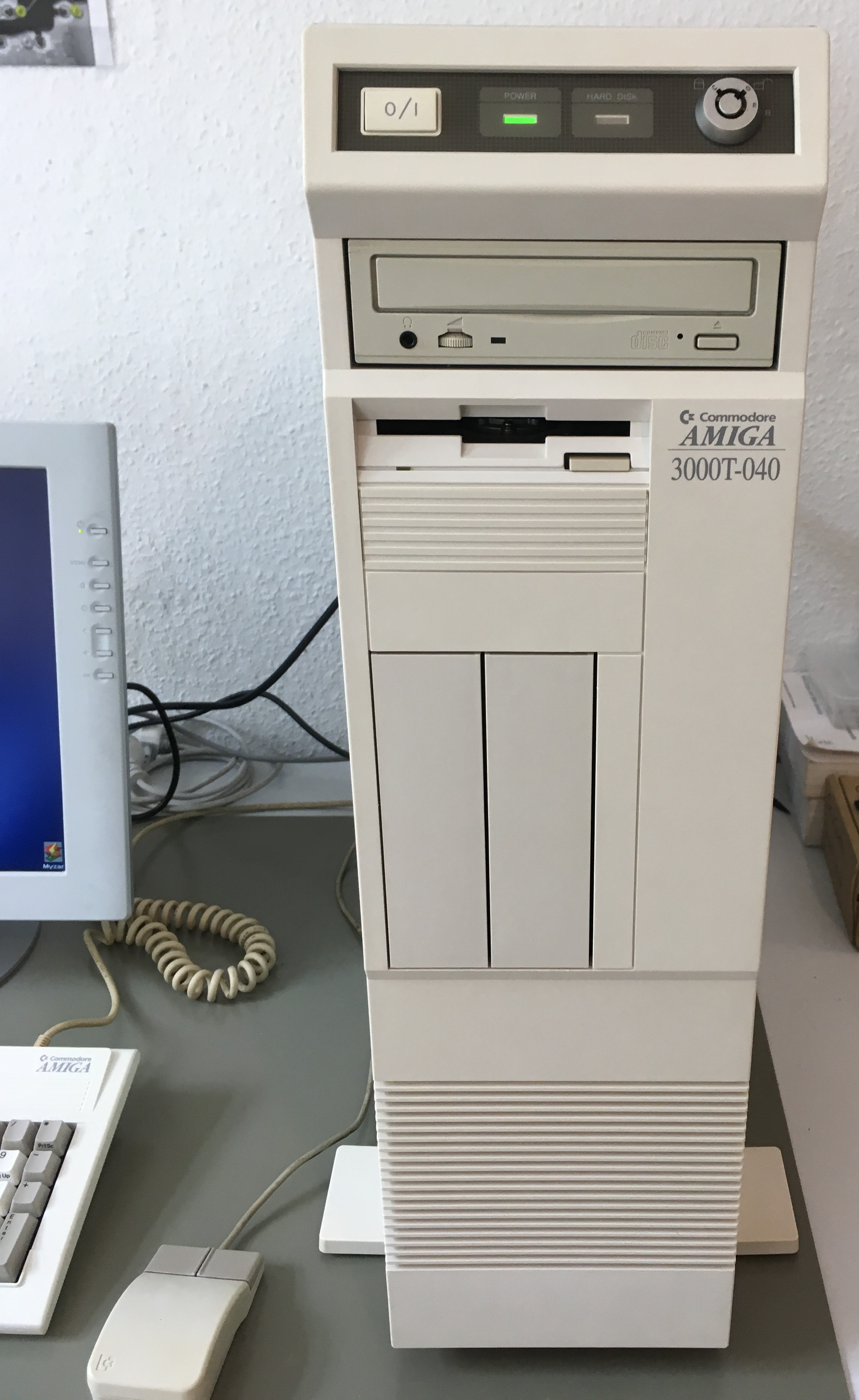
- Type: Personal computer
- Released: 1991; 35 years ago
- Discontinued: 1992
- Units sold: 14,380 units in Germany (including Amiga 3000 sales)
- Operating system: Amiga OS 2.0
- CPU: Motorola 68030 @ 25 MHz or 68040 @ 25 MHz
- Memory: 5 MB, expandable to 18 MB

The Amiga 3000T is a computer manufactured by Commodore. It is closely related to the Amiga 3000, although it came in a tower case which offers greater expandability. The case for the prototype, the 3500, was derived from Commodore's PC compatible line.

Like the desktop variant it is based upon, the A3000T has a CPU FAST slot which allows for processor upgrades. Later models were offered with a 68040 CPU in this slot, and third-party upgrades can be used to add a PowerPC processor.

The A3000T has a variety of drive bays – two 3.5-inch drives and one 5.25-inch half-height drive, mounted horizontally; and two 5.25-inch half-height drives mounted vertically. Inside, behind these bays, there is space for two more, internal, 5.25-inch half-height drives. The available drive bays make it possible to internally install up to seven drives in the A3000T.

The A3000T's specifications closely resemble the horizontal-cased Amiga 3000, but the motherboard has been heavily redesigned. As a result, the expansion-slot layout is more like the Amiga 2000's with five Zorro III slots, one of which is inline with the video slot, and four 16-bit ISA slots (passive), two of which are inline with Zorro slots (activated with bridgeboards).

At introduction, the retail price of an Amiga 3000 system could exceed $5000, depending on configuration. As a result of its high price and poor marketing, the machine did not sell in great numbers.

The machine is reported to have sold 14,380 units in Germany (including Amiga 3000 sales).

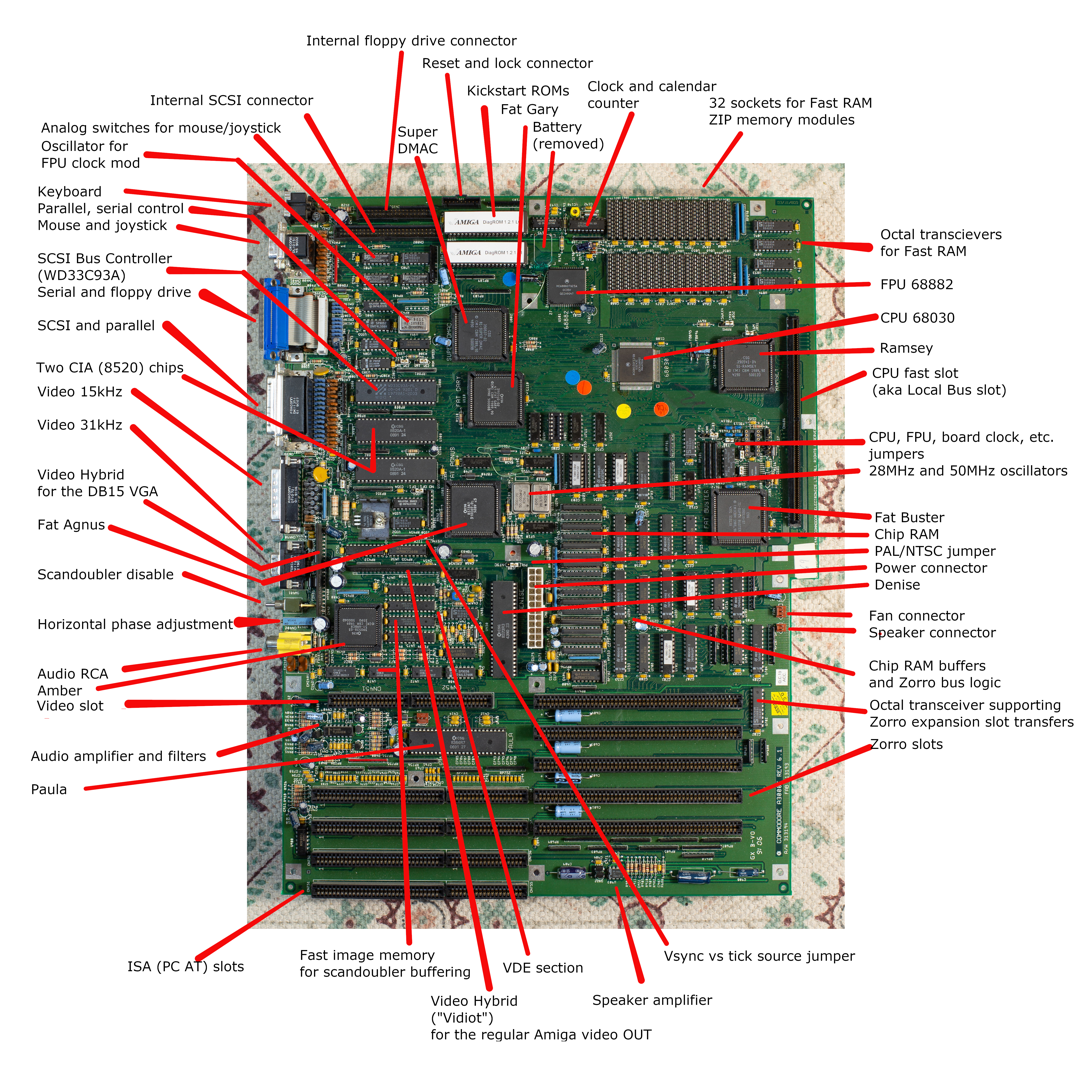
Amiga 3000T mainboard with annotations

== See also ==
- List of Amiga models and variants
