= Great Valley Products =

Third-party Amiga hardware company

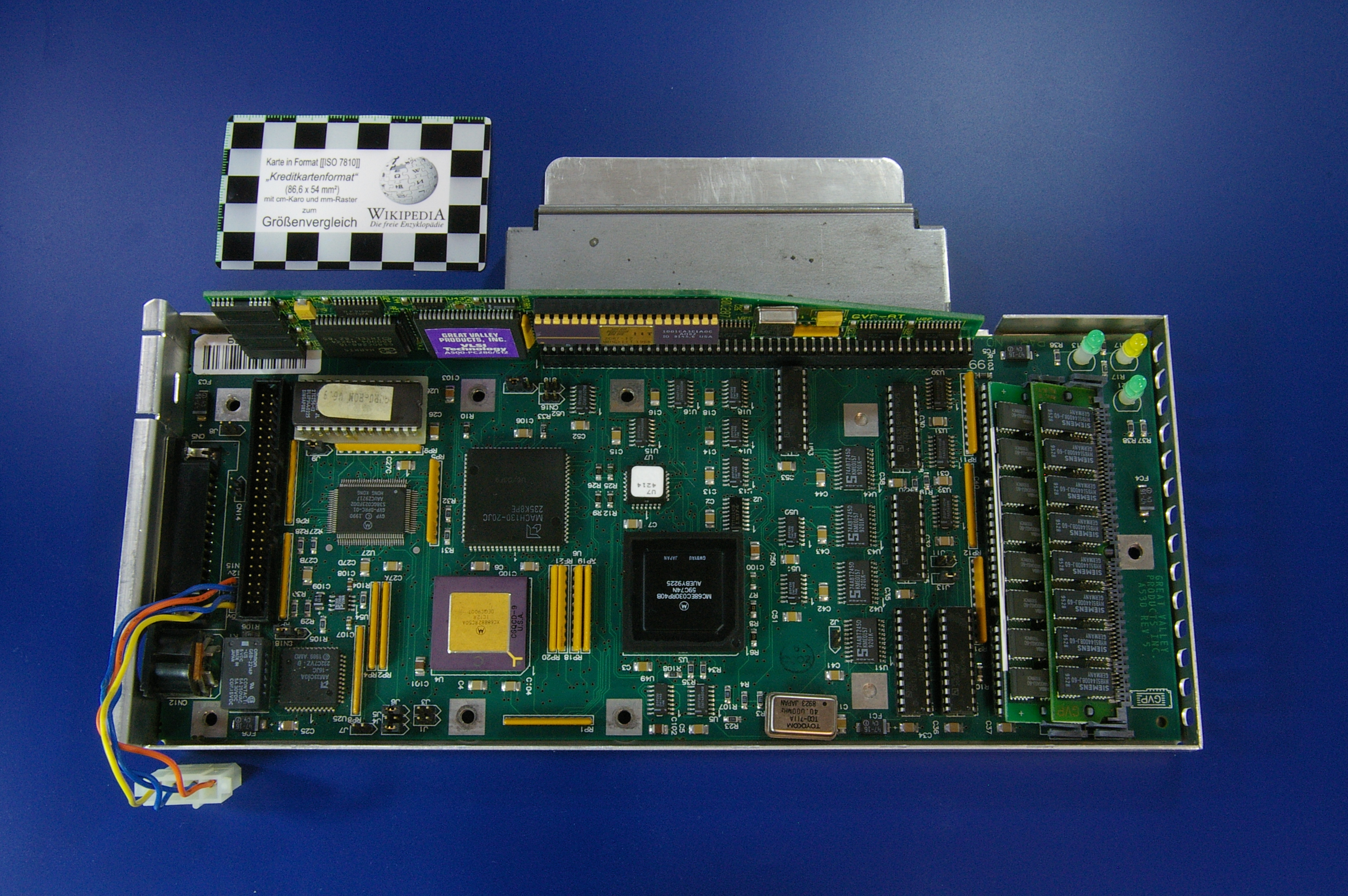
- GVP A530 Turbo with EC030 @ 40 MHz, 68882, 2x 4 MB 60 ns, PC-286
- Industry: Computer hardware
- Defunct: July 1995
- Fate: Liquidated
- Successor: GVP-M
- Key people: Gerard Bucas (President)
- Products: Amiga 500 and Amiga 2000 hardware, GVP A530 Turbo

Great Valley Products is a former third-party Amiga hardware supplier. The company was known for CPU accelerators and SCSI host adapters for the Amiga 500 and Amiga 2000 computer series. The company liquidated itself in July 1995. A new company known as GVP-M picked up the rights to the Amiga products.

== Employee shareholders ==
Great Valley Products was owned by its managing employees and their family members.

- Gerard Bucas – President
- David Ziembicki Sr. – Vice President of Operations
- Jeff Boyer – Vice President of Engineering
- Gregg Garnick – Vice President of Sales
- Erik Quackenbush – Director of Software Development
- George Rapp – Director of Technical Support

== GVP A530 Turbo ==
The GVP A530 Turbo is a processor accelerator, disc controller, and PC-286 co-system for the Amiga 500, released in 1992 by Great Valley Products.

Quantity	Value
Processor:	MC68EC030 @ 40 MHz or 030 @ 40 MHz or 030 @ 50 MHz
FPU:	Optional MC68882 (PGA) at the same frequency as the processor.
MMU:	None in EC030 version, internal in other versions.
Maximum RAM:	8 MB
RAM type:	2 x 64-pin GVP SIMM slots.
Disc controller:	AMD AM33C93A, SCSI 50-pin and an external DB25. 3.58 MB/s maximum
Option:	CPU 80C286, FPU option 80C287 @ 16 MHz MS-DOS emulator. RAM 512 kB plus access to Amiga RAM up to 8 MB. Video Modes: color CGA, monochrome Hercules, EGA, VGA, T3100 (640x400) and access to Amiga resources.
Connections:	Power 5-pin DIN (50W +5V +12V), Bus Zorro II (sideport), SCSI DB25F, Internal SCSI 50-pin IDC
