= SIPP memory =

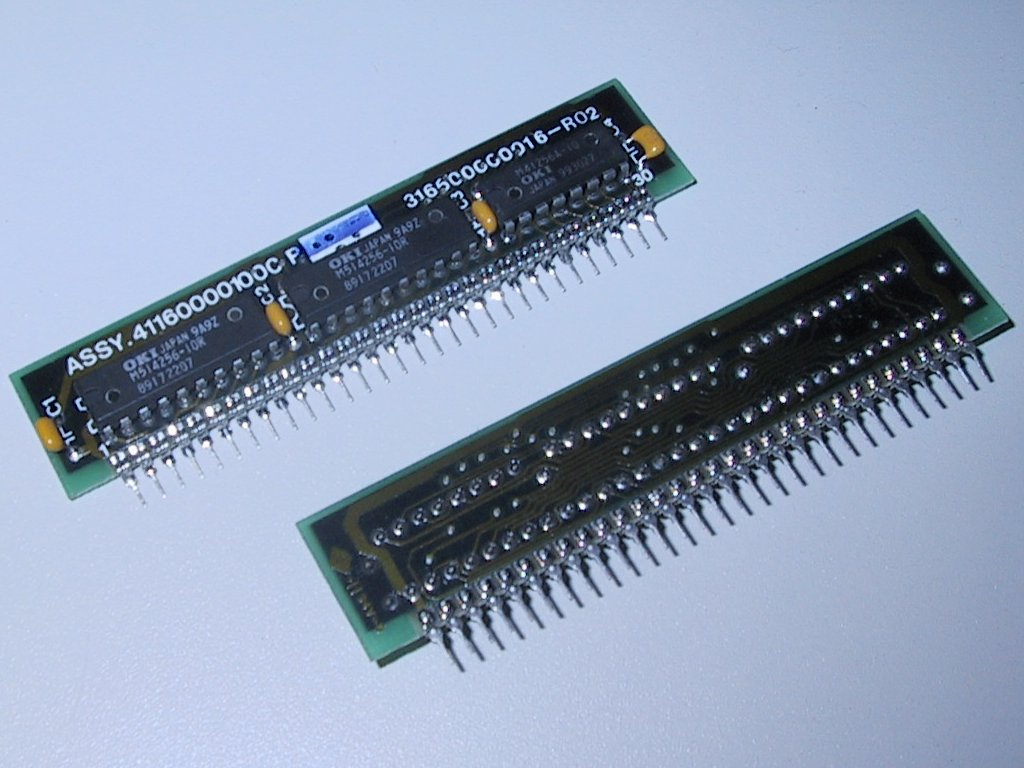
Two SIPP memory modules

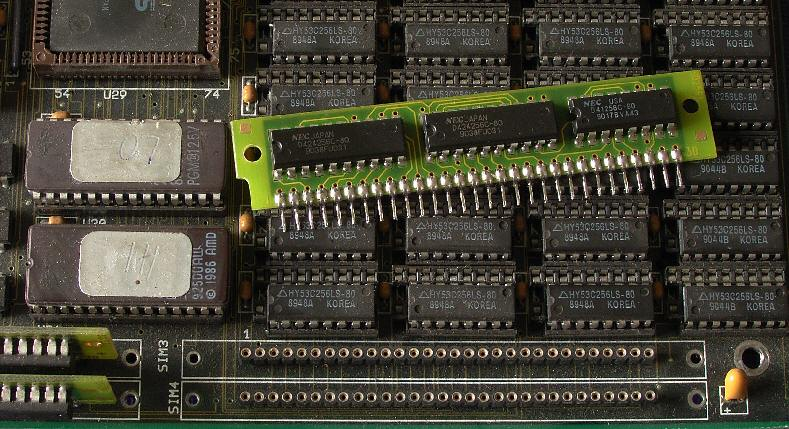
SIPP module beside empty SIPP sockets on a motherboard

A SIPP (single in-line pin package) or SIP (single in-line package) was a short-lived variant of the 30-pin SIMM random-access memory.

It consisted of a small printed circuit board upon which were mounted a number of memory chips. It had 30 pins along one edge which mated with matching holes in the motherboard of the computer.

This type of memory was used in some 80286 and 80386 (80386SX) systems. It was soon replaced by SIMMs using edge connectors, which proved to be more economical and durable.

30-pin SIPP modules were pin compatible with 30-pin SIMM modules explaining why some SIPP modules were in fact SIMM modules with pins soldered onto the connectors.

== See also ==
- Zig-zag in-line package
