= EOS memory =

EOS memory (for ECC on SIMMs) is an error-correcting memory system built into SIMMs, used to upgrade server-class computers without built-in ECC memory support. The EOS SIMM itself does the error checking, with reduced need for ECC memory modules and support. The technology was introduced by IBM in the mid-1990s.
