= Autoconfig =

Amiga system for automatically setting up hardware peripherals

Autoconfig is an auto-configuration protocol of Amiga computers which is intended to automatically assign resources to expansion devices without the need for jumper settings. It is analogous to PCI configuration through ACPI.

Autoconfig is integrated within the Amiga's Kickstart firmware, usually stored in ROM. When the system is switched on, AmigaOS interrogates each expansion device in turn and assigns address space or resources as needed. For example, in the case of a memory card, the OS can dynamically add the memory to the system. Through Autoconfig the OS can access firmware on expansion devices, for example, to boot from a disk connected to a hard disk controller.

== Protocol ==
Expansion devices respond to certain fixed memory addresses starting at hexadecimal 0xE8 0000 (or 0xFF00 0000 for Zorro III) if the /CFGIN signal is asserted and the device is not already configured. The CPU reads nibbles of configuration information (usually supplied by a PAL) such as manufacturer ID, product ID, and the amount of address space the device requires. The CPU then writes a base memory address to the device (or tells it to "shut up" if for some reason it can't be configured), and the device asserts /CFGOUT.

The /CFGIN of the first device is tied to ground. The second device's /CFGIN is controlled by the first device's /CFGOUT, and so on.

In a backplane design such as the Amiga 2000, connecting the /CFGOUT of one slot directly to the /CFGIN of the next would create the problem that an unoccupied slot would break the configuration chain. To solve this, the backplane ORs the /CFGIN and /CFGOUT signals to form the /CFGIN for the next slot (/CFGOUT is pulled low if undriven), which allows empty slots to be bypassed. This requires one 74LS32 (quad OR gate) on the Amiga 2000, which is the only motherboard hardware required by Autoconfig.

== Hardware specifications and bus connections ==
Autoconfig is part of the Zorro II and Zorro III expansion bus specification for configuring expansion devices in Amiga systems. Zorro II was first used in the Amiga 2000, though a similar expansion bus is present on the Amiga 1000. Zorro II is a relatively straightforward extension of the 68000 bus. Autoconfig requires the 68000 data and address bus to be available to all devices on the bus. In theory, a virtual address system, as used in PCI, would require a minor revision to Autoconfig.

The Amiga 2000 can accommodate five Zorro expansion cards, such as, RAM expansions, SCSI controllers and graphic cards. However the standard does not put a limit on the number of devices. In the A2000, two Zorro II slots are aligned with ISA slots. The Zorro bus and ISA bus can be connected by means of a "bridgeboard", such as, the Janus Hardware Emulator, which allows emulation of Intel 80286 or 80386 systems.

Zorro III is the 32 bit auto-configuring expansion bus of Amiga 3000 and Amiga 4000 systems. From the A3000 design onwards, it was deemed desirable for all enumerable hardware expansions to use Autoconfig. It is OS-legal for non-Autoconfig hardware to be completely ignored and the standard was adopted in AmigaOS 3.1.

== Notation ==
In early Commodore documents it was styled Auto Configuration, auto-config or AutoConfig, whereas in later documents it was styled AUTOCONFIG.
