= Auto-configuration =

Automatic configuration of peripherals

Auto-configuration is the automatic configuration of devices without manual intervention, without any need for software configuration programs or jumpers. Ideally, auto-configuring devices should just "plug and play". Auto-configuration has been made common because of the low cost of microprocessors and other embedded controller devices.

Configurations may be stored in NVRAM, loaded by a host processor, or negotiated at system initialization time. In some cases, hot pluggable devices may be able to renegotiate their configuration.

Example of auto-configuring devices:

- USB

Example of auto-configuring devices and protocols:

- DHCP
- Zeroconf

== See also ==
- Autoconfig, Amiga system for automatically setting up hardware peripherals
- FPGA
- Universal Plug and Play
