= RAM parity =

Early computer error-detection technique

RAM parity checking is the storing of a redundant parity bit representing the parity (odd or even) of a small amount of computer data (typically one byte) stored in random-access memory, and the subsequent comparison of the stored and the computed parity to detect whether a data error has occurred.

The parity bit was originally stored in additional individual memory chips; with the introduction of plug-in DIMM, SIMM, etc. modules, they became available in non-parity and parity (with an extra bit per byte, storing 9 bits for every 8 bits of actual data) versions.

== History ==
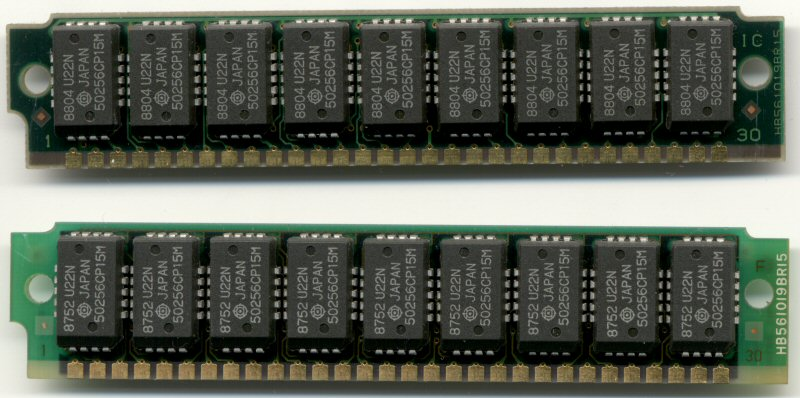
A 30-pin SIMM memory modules with 9 one-bit-wide memory chips. The ninth chip is used to store parity.

Early computers sometimes required the use of parity RAM, and parity-checking could not be disabled. A parity error typically caused the machine to halt, with loss of unsaved data; this is usually a better option than saving corrupt data. Logic parity RAM, also known as fake parity RAM, is non-parity RAM that can be used in computers that require parity RAM. Logic parity RAM recalculates an always-valid parity bit each time a byte is read from memory, instead of storing the parity bit when the memory is written to; the calculated parity bit, which will not reveal if the data has been corrupted (hence the name "fake parity"), is presented to the parity-checking logic. It is a means of using cheaper 8-bit RAM in a system designed to use only 9-bit parity RAM.

== Memory errors ==
In the 1970s-80s, RAM reliability was often less-than-perfect; in particular, the 4116 DRAMs which were an industry standard from 1975 to 1983 had a considerable failure rate as they used triple voltages (-5, +5, and +12) which resulted in high operating temperatures. By the mid-1980s, these had given way to single voltage DRAM such as the 4164 and 41256 with the result of improved reliability. However, RAM did not achieve modern standards of reliability until the 1990s. Since then errors have become less visible as simple parity RAM has fallen out of use; either they are invisible as they are not detected, or they are corrected invisibly with ECC RAM. Modern RAM is believed, with much justification, to be reliable, and error-detecting RAM has largely fallen out of use for non-critical applications. By the mid-1990s, most DRAM had dropped parity checking as manufacturers felt confident that it was no longer necessary. Some machines that support parity or ECC allow checking to be enabled or disabled in the BIOS, permitting cheaper non-parity RAM to be used. If parity RAM is used the chipset will usually use it to implement error correction, rather than halting the machine on a single-bit parity error.

However, as discussed in the article on ECC memory, errors, while not everyday events, are not negligibly infrequent. Even in the absence of manufacturing defects, naturally occurring radiation causes random errors; tests on Google's many servers found that memory errors were not rare events, and that the incidence of memory errors and the range of error rates across different DIMMs were much higher than previously reported.

== Error correction ==
Simple go/no go parity checking requires that the memory have extra, redundant bits beyond those needed to store the data; but if extra bits are available, they can be used to correct, as well as detect, errors. Earlier memory as used in, for example, the IBM PC/AT were available in versions that supported either no checking or parity checking (in earlier computers that used individual RAM chips rather than DIMM or SIMM modules, extra chips were used to store parity bits); if the computer detected a parity error it would display a message to that effect and stop. The SDRAM and DDR modules that replaced the earlier types are usually available either without error-checking or with ECC (full correction, not just parity).

An example of a single-bit error that would be ignored by a system with no error-checking, would halt a machine with parity checking, or would be invisibly corrected by ECC: a single bit is stuck at 1 due to a faulty chip, or becomes changed to 1 due to background or cosmic radiation; a spreadsheet storing numbers in ASCII format is loaded, and the number "8" is stored in the byte which contains the stuck bit as its eighth bit; then another change is made to the spreadsheet and it is stored. However, the "8" (00111000 binary) has become a "9" (00111001).

If the stored parity is different from the parity computed from the stored data, at least one bit must have been changed due to data corruption. Undetected memory errors can have results ranging from undetectable and without consequence, to permanent corruption of stored data or machine crash. In the case of the home PC where data integrity is often perceived to be of little importance—certainly true for, say games and web browsing, less so for Internet banking and home finances—non-parity memory is an affordable option. However, if data integrity is required, parity memory will halt the computer and prevent the corrupt data from affecting results or stored data, although losing intermediate unstored data and preventing use until any faulty RAM is replaced. For the expense of some computational overhead, of negligible impact with modern fast computers, detected errors can be corrected—this is increasingly important on networked machines serving many users.

=== ECC type RAM ===
RAM with ECC or Error Correction Code can detect and correct errors. As with parity RAM, additional information needs to be stored and more processing needs to be done, making ECC RAM more expensive and a little slower than non-parity and logic parity RAM. This type of ECC memory is especially useful for any application where reliability or uptime is a concern: failing bits in a memory word are detected and corrected on the fly with no impact to the application. The occurrence of the error is typically logged by the operating system for analysis by a technical resource. In the case where the error is persistent, server downtime can be scheduled to replace the failing memory unit.

== Wang lawsuit ==
In 1991, Wang won a judgment against Toshiba and NEC over its patents on SIMMs, based in part on its claim of using a ninth RAM chip for parity. In response, SIMMs with three chips rather than nine separate chips for each bit became popular under the theory they did not infringe. However, the switch from nine-chip SIMMs to three-chip SIMMs caused some compatibility issues. One year later in 1992, Wang also sued Mitsubishi, but Wang did not ultimately prevail in that because the courts determined in 1997 that a licensing agreement was in place. Eventually by the end of the 1990s, DIMMs had supplanted SIMMs in the marketplace, and DIMMs were not subject to Wang's lawsuits.

== See also ==
- DRAM error detection and correction
- Single-event upset
