= Computer configuration =

Arrangement of computer hardware and software

In communications or computer systems, a configuration of a system refers to the arrangement of each of its functional units, according to their nature, number and chief characteristics. Often, configuration pertains to the choice of hardware, software, firmware, and documentation. Along with its architecture, the configuration of a computer system affects both its function and performance.

The configuration of a computer is typically recorded in a configuration file. In modern computer systems, this is created and updated automatically as physical components are added or removed. Applications may assume that the configuration file is an accurate representation of the physical configuration and act accordingly.

Most modern computer systems provide a mechanism called the system settings (or "control panel") that permits users to set their preferences. These include system accessibility options (such as the default size of the system font), brightness and contrast; security and privacy; network selection and so on.

== See also ==
- Auto-configuration – Automatic configuration of peripherals
- BIOS settings – Firmware for hardware initialization and OS runtime services
- Configuration management – Process for maintaining consistency of a product attributes with its design
  - Software configuration management – Tracking and controlling software changes
- Configuration file – File holding settings for a computer program
- Configurator – Personnel who configure systems
- System Settings – MacOS application
- Settings (Windows) – Configuration interface of Windows 8 or later
