= Amiga 3000 =

Personal computer by Commodore

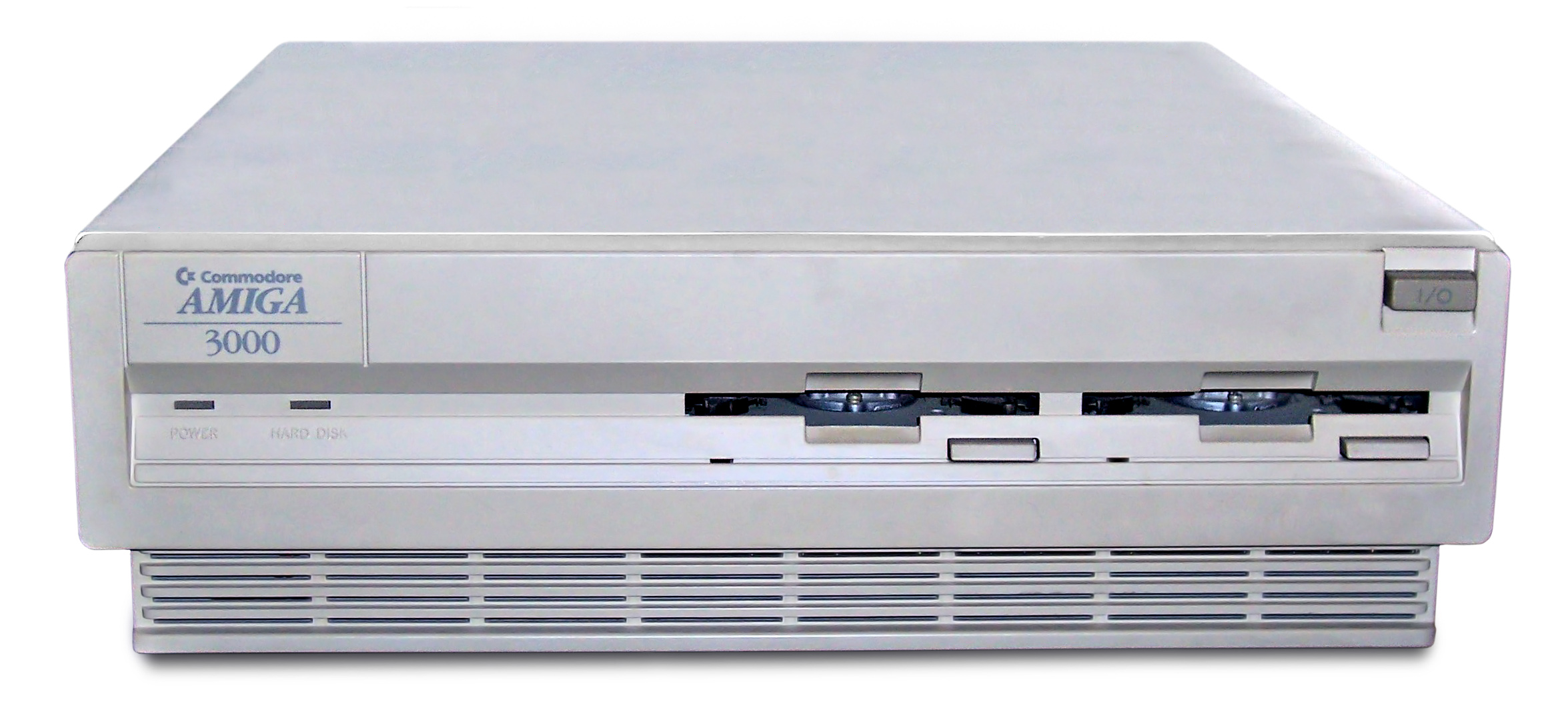
- Amiga 3000 Front
- Type: Personal computer
- Released: June 1990
- Introductory price: US$3,379 (equivalent to $8,300 in 2025)
- Discontinued: 1992
- Units sold: 14,380 units in Germany (including Amiga 3000T sales)
- Operating system: AmigaOS 1.3 or 2.x, Unix SVR4
- CPU: Motorola 68030 @ 16 or 25 MHz
- Memory: 2 MB
- Predecessor: Amiga 2000, Amiga 2500
- Successor: Amiga 4000

The Amiga 3000 (A3000) is a personal computer released by Commodore in June 1990. It is the successor to the Amiga 2000 and its upgraded model Amiga 2500 with more processing speed, improved graphics, and a new revision of the operating system.

== Overview ==
Its predecessors, the Amiga 500, 1000 and 2000, share the same fundamental system architecture and consequently perform without much variation in processing speed despite considerable variation in purchase price. The A3000 however, was entirely reworked and rethought as a high-end workstation. The new Motorola 32-bit 68030 CPU, 68882 math co-processor, and 32-bit system memory increase the integer processing speed by a factor of 5 to 18, and the floating-point processing speed by a factor of 7 to 200 times. The new 32-bit Zorro III expansion slots provide for faster and more powerful expansion capabilities.

In common with earlier Amigas the 3000 runs a 32-bit operating system called AmigaOS. Version 2.0 is generally considered to have a more ergonomic and attractive interface than previous versions, which were designed with television sets as a lowest common denominator display. Access for application developers was simplified.

The A3000UX is an A3000 variant bundled with the UNIX System V operating system. Commodore had a licensing agreement with AT&T to include a port of Unix System V (release 4). Commodore also sold a tower variant called the A3000T.

Two enhanced version - the Amiga 3000+ and the AA3000 - with the AGA chipset and an AT&T DSP3210 signal processing chip were produced to prototype stage in 1991. Instead of the Amiga 3000+ and AA3000, Commodore replaced the A3000 six months behind schedule, in the fall of 1992, with the A4000.

The machine is reported to have sold 14,380 units in Germany (including Amiga 3000T sales).

== Technical information ==
The Amiga 3000 shipped with a Motorola 68030 at either 16 or 25 MHz and 2 MB of RAM. It includes the Enhanced Chip Set (ECS), a display enhancer for use with a VGA monitor, and a DMA SCSI-1 controller and hard disk drive.

"Fast RAM" can be increased by fitting DIP (up to 4 MB) or ZIP DRAM chips (up to 16 MB) available in two varieties, Page Mode or Static Column.

The A3000, unlike most Amiga models, supports both ROM-based Kickstarts and disk-based Kickstarts (the early "SuperKickstart" model), although not simultaneously. Kickstart V1.4 is actually a beta version of Kickstart which is loaded from disk. 68040 microprocessors require at least 2.0 ROMs.

The A3000 has a number of Amiga-specific connectors including two DE-9 ports for joysticks, mice, and light pens, a standard 25-pin RS-232 serial port and a 25-pin Centronics parallel port. As a result, at launch the A3000 was compatible with many existing Amiga peripherals, such as MIDI devices, serial modems, and sound samplers.

The A3000 has four internal 32-bit Zorro III expansion slots. This expansion bus allows the use of devices which comply with the AutoConfig standard, such as graphic cards, audio cards, network cards, and later even USB controllers.

The two passive ISA slots can be activated by use of a bridgeboard, which connects the Zorro and ISA buses. Such bridgeboards typically feature on-board IBM-PC-compatible hardware, including Intel 80286, 80386 or 80486 microprocessors allowing emulation of an entire IBM PC system in hardware. A compatible ISA card may then be installed in the remaining ISA slot.

=== Specifications ===
Attribute	Specification
Processor	Motorola 68030 at 16 or 25 MHz
FPU	68881 (16 MHz) or 68882 (25 MHz)
RAM	2 MB (configured as 1 MB "chip" and 1 MB "fast" RAM) Maximum 2 MB 32-bit (Note: Chip RAM is 32-bit for CPU access only) chip RAM and 16 MB fast RAM on-board Upgradable by further 128 MB via the CPU slot and 2 GB by Zorro III expansions
ROM	512 KB Kickstart ROM (Note: Early models came with a 1.4 beta Kickstart for selectively booting 1.3 or 2.0 from disk, later models used a real 2.0 Kickstart ROM)
Chipset	Enhanced Chip Set (ECS)
Video	12-bit color palette (4096 colors) Graphic modes from: 320×200 to 320×512 with 32, 64 (EHB mode) or 4096 (HAM mode) on-screen colors; 640×200 to 640×512 with 16 on-screen colors; 1280×200 to 1280×512 with 4 on-screen colors; Horizontal scan rates of 15.60-31.44 kHz; Vertical scan rates of 50–72 Hz; Built-in "display enhancer" (scan-doubler and de-interlacer) for use with VGA monitor
Audio	4 × 8-bit PCM channels (2 stereo channels) 28–56 kHz maximum DMA sampling rate (dependent on video mode in use)
Internal storage	40, 50 or 100 MB 3.5-inch SCSI hard disk drive (upgradable)
Removable storage	3.5-inch floppy disk drive, double density (880 kB capacity) or high density (1760 kB capacity)
Input/output ports	Analog RGB video out (DB-23M) Analog VGA out (DB-15F); Audio out (2 × RCA); Keyboard (5-pin DIN); 2 × Mouse/Gamepad ports (DE9); RS-232 serial port (DB-25M); Centronics style parallel port (DB-25F); Floppy disk drive port (DB-23F); 50-pin internal SCSI connector External SCSI connector (DB-25F)
Expansion slots	4 × 100pin 32-bit Zorro III slots 1 × video slot (inline with Zorro slot); 2 × passive 16-bit ISA slots (requires bridgeboard to activate); 1 × 200-pin CPU expansion slot 8 × 30-pin DIP slots 32 × ZIP slots
Operating system	AmigaOS 1.3 (Kickstart 1.3/Workbench 1.3) or AmigaOS 2.0 (Kickstart 2.04/Workbench 2.04)
Other	2 × front-accessible 3.5-inch drive bays 1 × internal 3.5-inch drive mounting Battery backed real-time clock

== See also ==
- List of Amiga models and variants
