= Doctrine of parity =

Agricultural price controls in the US

The doctrine of parity was used to justify agricultural price controls in the United States beginning in the 1920s. It was the belief that farming should be as profitable as it was between 1909 and 1914, an era of high food prices and farm prosperity. The doctrine sought to restore the "terms of trade" enjoyed by farmers in those years. It was highly controversial, since critics argued it ignored changes in agricultural productivity and set an artificial standard.

The doctrine developed in the 1920s as food prices declined after the First World War. The first attempt at instituting the parity doctrine was the McNary-Haugen Bill, vetoed by President Calvin Coolidge in 1928. Farming prices decreased further during the Great Depression, leading to parity-seeking New Deal era legislation, such as the Agricultural Adjustment Act of 1933.

Political pressure to enforce parity declined after the 1940s and 1950s as commodity prices rose. However, New Deal programs remained in place, and agricultural price regulations were still regularly introduced.

== Background: the "Golden Age" of farming ==
American farm commodity prices rose throughout the 19th century. Even when occasional declines and farmer complaints occurred, like in the mid-1880s, the federal government only intervened through tariffs, anti-trust laws, and small measures to spur demand. There was no conscious effort to bring prices to an “ideal” level. In the early 1910s, commodity prices rose even further, and by 1914, farm prices were at their highest level in a century. The prosperous 5-10 year period before 1914 is often referred to as the “Golden Age” of agriculture, and the relative price level of this time would set the standard for “parity.”

America’s involvement in the First World War in 1917 spurred the first large-scale federal intervention in the farm commodities market. Out of wartime necessity, the government allowed executive regulation of agricultural production and requisitioned food supplies. This wartime intervention, though not implemented with the intention of aiding farmers, would lay the foundation for later regulations. After the war, prices declined; 1921 saw a particularly sharp drop. During this period, the first organized farm lobbies were created.

== Parity efforts before 1933 ==
As political pressure rose, the McNary-Haugen Bill was introduced in Congress in January 1924. The bill would control US agriculture prices by having the federal government purchase excess supply. A fund of $200 million would be created for such a purpose. The target prices would be computed monthly by the Bureau of Labor Statistics, and would be real-price equivalents of those in the 1905-1914 period. The bill passed Congress in 1928, but was vetoed by President Calvin Coolidge.

Despite the political pressure, 1924-1929 farm commodity prices were, on average, only 5 percent lower than in the 1909-1914 parity period. In 1929-1933, however, farm prices declined much further. Between 1919 and 1933, wholesale agricultural prices declined by 67 percent, with most of this drop occurring after 1929. In 1930 alone, farm commodity prices declined by 37 percent. The Hoover administration passed the Agricultural Marketing Act in 1929, which introduced limited supply controls, but the price decline continued.

== The New Deal ==
In light of this decline, President Franklin D. Roosevelt passed the Agricultural Adjustment Act of 1933. This plan imposed acreage limitations on farmers in return for federal benefit payments. By limiting supply, the Act explicitly sought to raise prices and reestablish the relative purchasing power of farmers that had prevailed from 1909 to 1914.

These efforts did raise prices; but by 1938 the farm commodity price ratio was still at only 77 percent of pre-war parity. In 1940, agricultural prices were only 65 percent of 1929 prices. Throughout 1940, the ratio of agricultural prices to general prices remained well below that of the 1909–1914 era.

After 1940 the priorities of the federal government shifted to wartime needs. Civilian demand was no longer incentivized, and supply was stimulated. Following the war, however, New-Deal-era programs continued, and parity prices were continually recalculated throughout the following decades. After 1948, parity-prices were linked to the relationships among farm and nonfarm prices during the most recent 10-year period, rather than only on the 1909–1914 benchmark, thereby adjusting for changes in relative productivity.

== Criticism ==
The doctrine of parity was politically controversial, particularly in the 1930s and 1940s. Proponents believed the period from 1909 to 1914 had represented a desirable "dynamic" equilibrium between the industrial and manufacturing sectors of the economy. They pointed to the era's low unemployment and industrial stability. The departure from this ideal was blamed on World War I's massive distortions.

Critics countered that the parity doctrine was based on political, not economic, arguments. They said it ignored changes in relative productivity. For instance, if productivity in agriculture (relative to the 1909–1914 base period) rose faster than in industry, the parity price would be too high, and vice versa. They argued the relative price structure of one period would quickly become obsolete as technology progresses at different paces in each economic sector.

== See also ==
- McNary-Haugen Bill
- History of agriculture in the United States
- Agricultural Adjustment Act
- Agricultural Adjustment Act of 1938
- Agricultural Adjustment Administration
