= Zig-zag in-line package =

Type of integrated circuit packaging

Zig-zag in-line package

The zig-zag in-line package (ZIP) is a packaging technology for integrated circuits. It was intended as a replacement for dual in-line packaging (DIL or DIP). A ZIP is an integrated circuit encapsulated in a slab of plastic with 16, 20, 28 or 40 pins, measuring (for the ZIP-20 package) about 3 mm × 30 mm × 10 mm. The package's pins protrude in two rows from one of the long edges. The two rows are staggered by 1.27 mm (0.05"), giving them a zig-zag appearance, and allowing them to be spaced more closely than a rectangular grid would allow. The pins are inserted into holes in a printed circuit board, with the packages standing at right-angles to the board, allowing them to be placed closer together than DIPs of the same size. ZIPs have now been superseded by surface-mount packages such as the thin small-outline packages (TSOPs), but are still in use. The quad in-line package uses a similar staggered semiconductor package design, but on two sides instead of one.

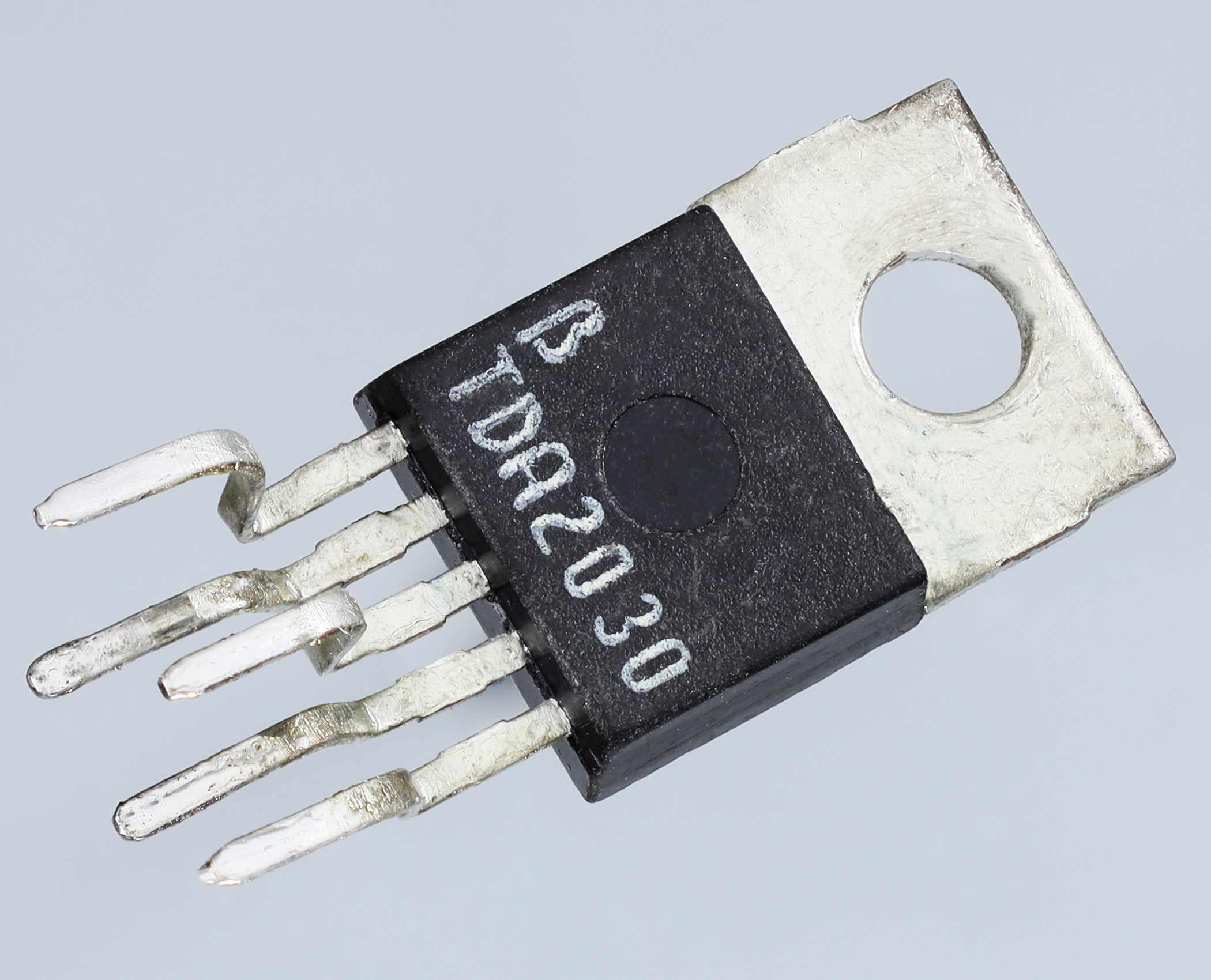
A TDA2030 audio power amplifier IC in a staggerd TO-220 with five leads.

High-power devices (such as high-voltage op-amp ICs, voltage regulators, and motor driver ICs) are still being manufactured in a package with a zig-zag pinout (and normally screwed onto a heatsink). These zig-zag packages include variations on the TO-220 such as "TO-220S", "staggered leads TO-220-11", "staggered leads TO-220-15", and HZIP. The trademarks Pentawatt or Hexawatt are also used for chips in multi-leaded power packages like TDA2002/2003/2020/2030 and L200.

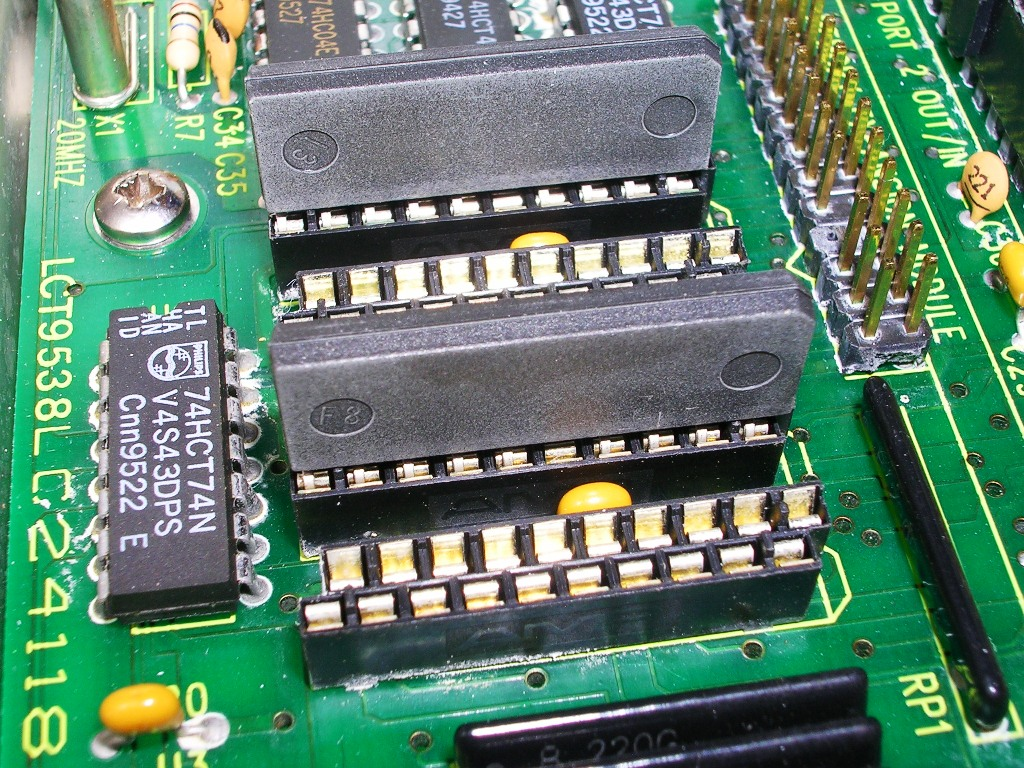
ZIP chips in ZIP sockets

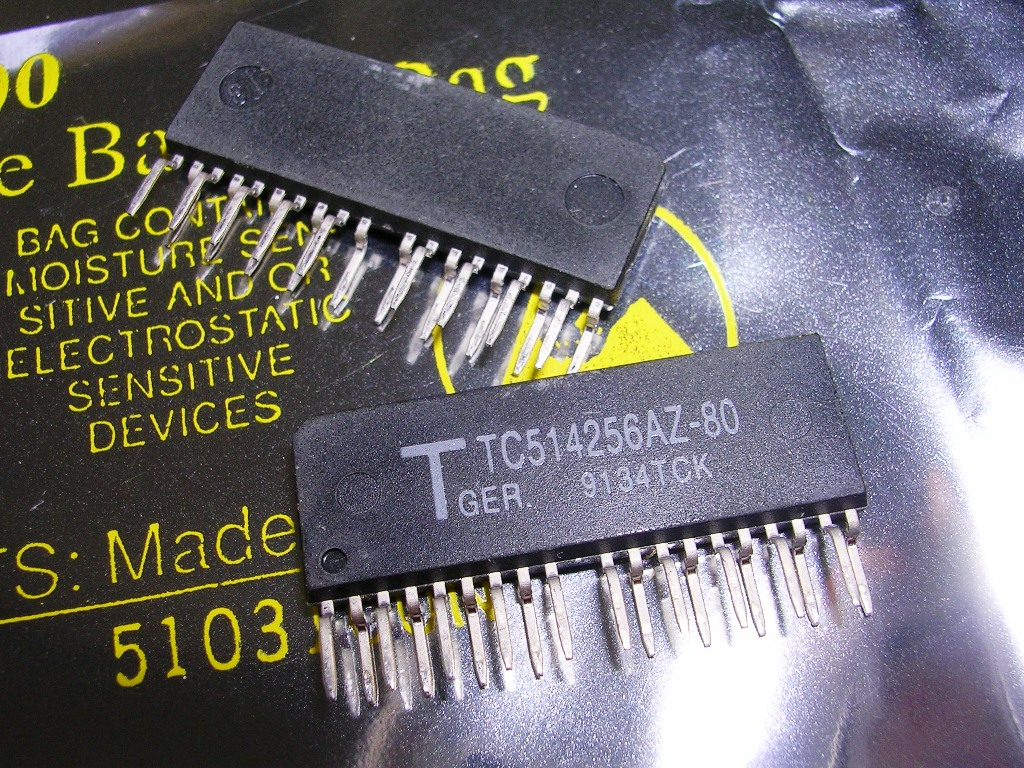
ZIP chips

As for computers, dynamic RAM ZIP chips are now only to be found in obsolete computers, some of these are:

- Amiga 500 expansion packs
- Amiga 3000 on-board memory and some expansion boards
- Commodore CDTV on-board memory
- Acorn Archimedes 300 and 400 series on-board memory
- Acorn Archimedes A3010 and A3020

== See also ==
- Types of chip carriers – list of chip package types
