= Zorro II =

Expansion bus used by the Amiga 2000 computer

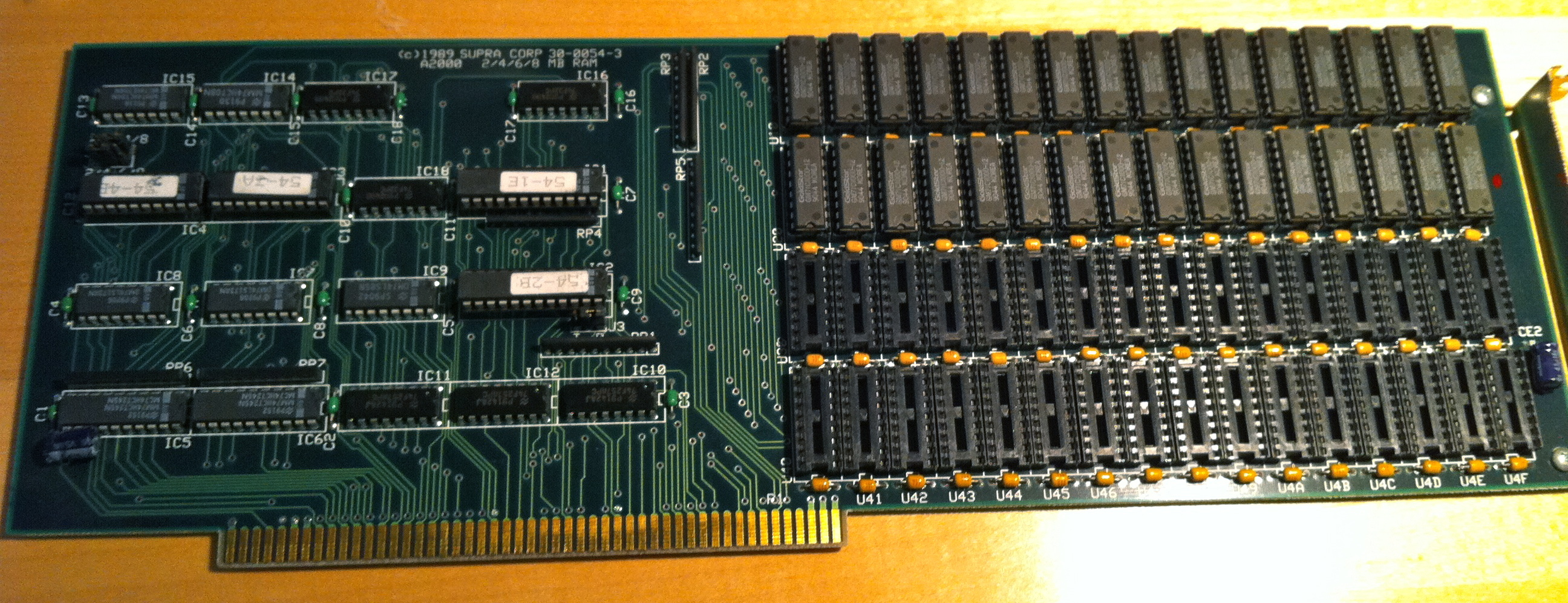
RAM expansion card for Zorro II Bus (4 MB installed, max 8 MB)

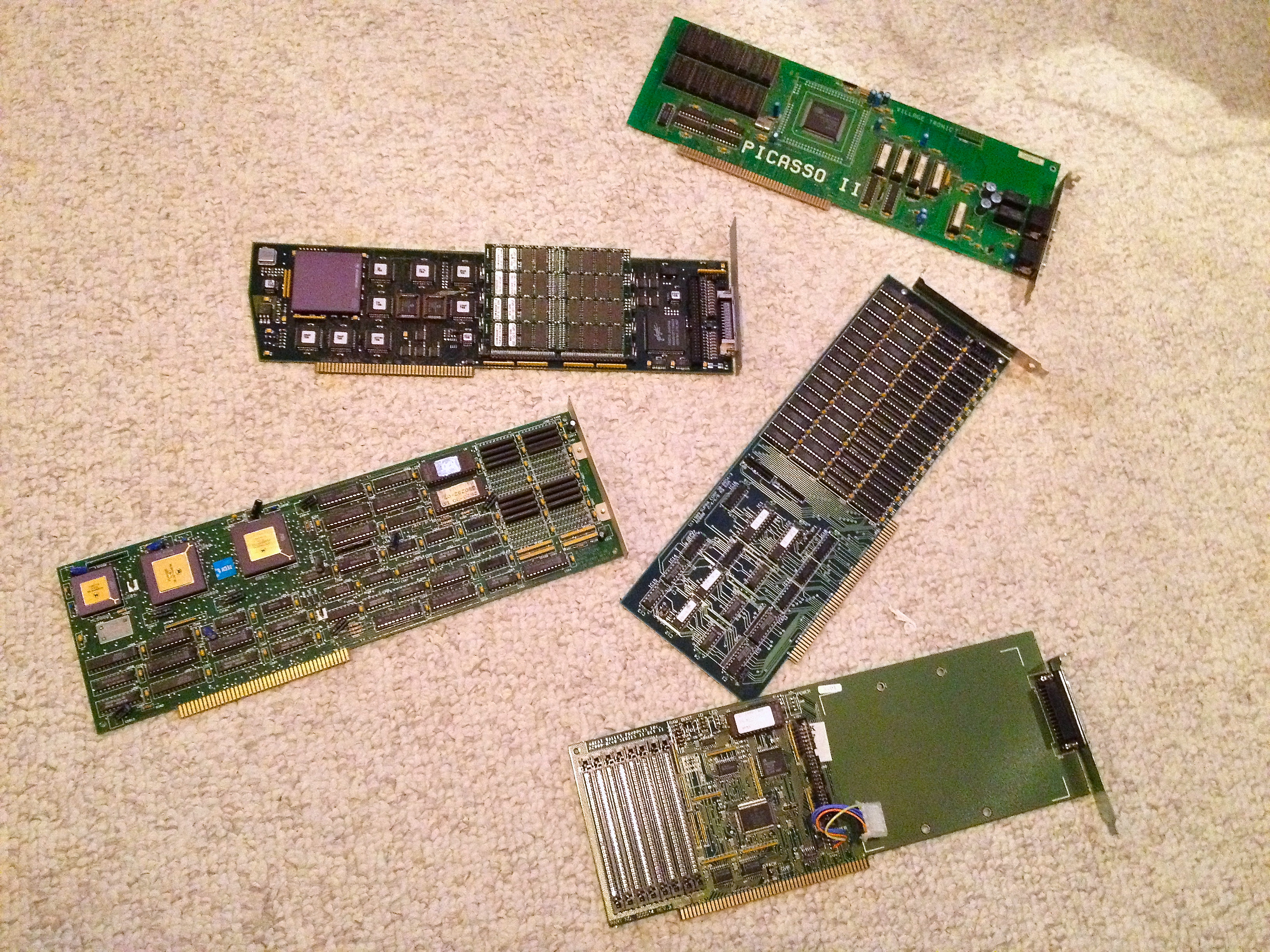
Amiga Zorro II cards

Zorro II is the general purpose expansion bus used by the Amiga 2000 computer. The bus is mainly a buffered extension of the Motorola 68000 bus, with support for bus mastering DMA. The expansion slots use a 100-pin connector and the card form factor is the same as the IBM PC. Zorro II cards implement the Autoconfig protocol for automatic address space assignment (similar to the later PCI technology on the PC).

The prototype "Zorro bus" expansion box for the Amiga 1000 was the basis for the initial Amiga 2000-A model design. This box connected to the Amiga 1000 unbuffered CPU bus card edge connector.

Zorro II was succeeded by Zorro III, a 32-bit, asynchronous bus.

== Amiga memory map ==
Address	Size [MByte]	Description
0x00 0000	2.0	Chip memory
0x20 0000	8.0	Zorro II memory expansion space
0xA0 0000	1.5	Zorro II I/O expansion space
0xB8 0000	3.0	A2000 motherboard register space
0xE8 0000	0.5	Zorro II I/O
0xF0 0000	1.0	Motherboard ROM
