= Zorro III =

Amiga 3000 expansion bus

The Zorro III is a computer bus specification, introduced in 1990 with the Amiga 3000. As an expansion bus, it is used to attach peripheral devices to an Amiga motherboard. Designed by Commodore International lead engineer Dave Haynie, the 32-bit Zorro III replaced the 16-bit Zorro II bus used in the Amiga 2000. As with the Zorro II bus, Zorro III allows for true Plug and Play autodetection (similar to, and prior to, the PC's PCI bus) wherein devices are dynamically allocated the resources they need on boot.

== Details ==
Zorro III continued Zorro II's direct memory-mapped address design (unlike 80x86 processors, the MC68K family used in the Amiga does not have a separate I/O address mechanism). Just as with Zorro II on 24-bit systems, Zorro III reserves a large chunk of 32-bit real memory address space for large memory mapped cards, a smaller chunk with smaller allocation granularity for "I/O" type board. Zorro III was never supported on 24-bit address or 16-bit data devices—it requires a full 32-bit CPU. The CPU can directly address any Zorro III device as memory, so Zorro memory expansions could be made (and were made) as well as it being possible to use video memory on a video card to be as system RAM.

As an asynchronous bus, Zorro III specifies bus cycles of set lengths during which a transaction conforming to the specifications of the bus can be carried out. The initial implementation of Zorro III was in Commodore's "Fat" Buster (BUS conTrollER) gate array, assisted by a very high speed PAL and numerous TTL buffer chips for bus buffering, isolation, and multiplexing. The Amiga 4000 implementation is fundamentally the same, but integrates a second gate-array to replace the TTL buffers. The Buster chip provides bus arbitration, translation between the MC68030 bus protocols and either Zorro II or Zorro III bus cycles (geographically mapped based on the Zorro bus address), and a vectored interrupt mechanism, generally not used. Zorro II bus masters are legal bus hogs, but Zorro III devices are fairly arbitrated and have controller-limited bus tenure.

Despite being a 32-bit bus, Zorro III uses the same 100 way slot and edge connector as Zorro II. The extra address and data lines are provided by multiplexing some of the existing connections with the nature of the lines changing at different stages of the bus access cycle (e.g. address becoming data). However, the bus is not fully multiplexed; the lower 8-bits of address are available during data cycles, which allows Zorro III to support a fast burst cycle in page-mode. Properly designed Zorro II expansion cards can coexist with Zorro III cards; it is not a requirement of a Zorro III bus master to support DMA access to Zorro II bus targets. Cards can detect a Zorro III vs. Zorro II backplane, allowing certain Zorro III cards to function when connected to the older Zorro II bus, though at Zorro II's reduced data rates.

The Zorro III bus has a theoretical bandwidth of 150 MByte/s, based on an ideal Zorro III master and slave device running with minimum setup and hold times. The real transfer speed between the Amiga 3000/4000 implementation of Zorro III and a Zorro III card is somewhere around 13.5 MByte/s due to the limitations of the Buster chip. This was comparable to Intel's first PCI implementation, which peaked at 25 MByte/s. Zorro III was optimized for future single-chip implementations of the protocol, but the resources available at Commodore in 1990 limited the initial implementation.

This is also the limiting factor with third-party Amiga PCI expansion boards like e.g. Elbox Mediator PCI or the Matay Prometheus PCI (about 12 MByte/s PCI to 68k-system). DMA transfers between two Zorro III cards (or PCI cards on an PCI expansion board) can be much faster.

== Memory map ==
Address	Size [MByte]	Description
0x0000 0000	2.0	Chip memory
0x0020 0000	8.0	Zorro II memory expansion space
0x00A0 0000	1.5	Zorro II I/O expansion space
0x00B8 0000	3.0	A2000 motherboard register space
0x00E8 0000	0.5	Zorro II I/O
0x00F0 0000	1.0	Motherboard ROM
0x0100 0000	112.0	A3000 motherboard space
0x0800 0000	128.0	32-Bit memory expansion space
0x1000 0000	1792.0	Zorro III expansion space
0x8000 0000	2032.0	Reserved
0xFF00 0000	64 KB	Zorro III Configuration unit
0xFF01 0000	16.0	Reserved
0xFFFF FFFF	16.0	Reserved

== Physical ==
The physical connector is a standard 2.5 mm (0.1 in) spaced card edge connector with 2 × 50 rows of pins.

Power:

[Volt]	[Ampere]
+5	2.0
−5	< 0.3
+12	< 8.0
−12	< 0.3

== See also ==
- List of interface bit rates#Computer buses
