= ThinkPad P series =

Series of mobile workstations by Lenovo

- 2016 ThinkPad P70 (17-inch variant)
- Developer: Lenovo
- Product family: ThinkPad
- Type: Mobile workstation
- Released: 2015
- Operating system: Microsoft Windows; Ubuntu; Red Hat Enterprise Linux
- CPU: Intel Core, AMD Ryzen PRO, Intel Xeon
- Display: Up to 16:10 16" 3840x2400 with optional touchscreen option (latest models)
- Graphics: Nvidia Quadro, Nvidia RTX, AMD Radeon, Intel Arc
- Camera: Up to 1080p camera
- Touchpad: Large touchpad with 3 buttons on the top
- Power: Up to 230 W
- Predecessor: ThinkPad W series
- Related: ThinkStation P series
- Website: Lenovo ThinkPad P Series: High-Performance Mobile Workstations Laptop | Lenovo US

The ThinkPad P series is a line of workstation laptop computers (mobile workstations) produced by Lenovo as part of the ThinkPad product family. Originally introduced in 2015 as a successor to the previous ThinkPad W series, the P series are the most powerful ThinkPad products offered by Lenovo.

== Overview ==
With 15.6" and 17.3" (later 16" only) screens, the ThinkPad P series saw the reintroduction of physically large laptops into the ThinkPad line. Marketed largely as portable workstations, many P series laptops can be configured with high-end mobile workstation-class Intel processors as well as error correction code (ECC) memory (only with Xeon and select Core HX processors) and a discrete Nvidia Quadro GPU. The P series offers independent software vendor (ISV) certifications from software vendors such as Adobe and Autodesk for various computer-aided design (CAD) software.

All 16" models have a standard 6-row ThinkPad Precision Keyboard (with Numeric Keypad and optional backlight), TrackPoint and touchpad, and optional fingerprint reader. In 2022, the 15.6" and 17.3" configurations have been dropped in favor of a 16" one, with the Core HX series, which replaced the mobile Xeon W line.

== Models ==
ThinkPad P series (2015–2024)
ThinkPad Yoga-based ThinkPad T series-based ThinkPad X1 Extreme-based
Screen	Type	P*1 2017	P*2 2018	P*3 2019	2020	2021	2022	2023	2024	2025
14"	Flipbook/Entry									
14"	Entry (slim)			P43s	P14s Gen 1	P14s Gen 2	P14s Gen 3	P14s Gen 4	P14s Gen 5	P14s Gen 6
15.6"	Ultrabook		P1 Gen 1	P1 Gen 2	P1 Gen 3	replaced by 16" line				
15.6"	Entry (slim)	P51s	P52s	P53s	P15s Gen 1	P15s Gen 2	replaced by P16s			
15.6"	Value/Mainstream				P15v Gen 1	P15v Gen 2	P15v Gen 3	replaced by P16v		
15.6"	Performance	P51	P52	P53	P15 Gen 1	P15 Gen 2	replaced by P16			
16"	Ultrabook					P1 Gen 4	P1 Gen 5	P1 Gen 6	P1 Gen 7	P1 Gen 8
16"	Ultrabook									T1g Gen 8
16"	Entry (slim)						P16s Gen 1	P16s Gen 2	P16s Gen 3	P16s Gen 4
16"	Value/Mainstream							P16v Gen 1	P16v Gen 2	P16v Gen 3
16"	Performance						P16 Gen 1	P16 Gen 2	P16 Gen 3	
17.3"	Performance	P71	P72	P73	P17 Gen 1	P17 Gen 2	replaced by P16			
Docks
Basic Docking Station; Pro Docking Station; Ultra Docking Station		P50s, P51s	replaced by USB-C docking stations							
230 W Workstation Dock		P50, P51; P70, P71	replaced by Thunderbolt Workstation Dock							
Basic Docking Station (USB-C); Pro Docking Station (USB-C); Ultra Docking Station (USB-C)			P52s	P43s; P53s	P14s Gen 1 P15s Gen 1 P15v Gen 1					
Thunderbolt; Workstation Dock			P1 Gen 1 P52; P72	P1 Gen 2 P53; P73	P1 Gen 3 P15 Gen 1 P17 Gen 1 P15v Gen 1	P1 Gen 4 P15 Gen 2 P17 Gen 2 P15v Gen 2	P1 Gen 5 P16 Gen 1 P15v Gen 3	P1 Gen 6 P16 Gen 2 P16v Gen 1		

Battery configuration

Main	M(x)	Main hot-swappable (max.cells)	Secondary	U	Ultrabay removable
Main	M(x)	Main hot-swappable (max.cells)	Secondary	u	Ultrabay unremovable
Main	M(x)	Main removable (max.cells)	Secondary	m(x)	internal (max.cells) "PowerBridge"
Main	m(x)	Main internal (max.cells)	Secondary	S	Slice battery

Laptop color codes

Processor

Socketed desktop processor
Socketed mobile processor
Soldered high power processor
Soldered standard power processor
Soldered low power processor
Soldered ultra low power processor

Weight

0.9 kg (2.0 lb)	Up to 0.91 kg
1.0 kg (2.2 lb)	0.92–1.0 kg
1.1 kg (2.4 lb)	1.01–1.1 kg
1.2 kg (2.6 lb)	1.11–1.2 kg
1.3 kg (2.9 lb)	1.21–1.3 kg
1.4 kg (3.1 lb)	1.31–1.4 kg
1.5 kg (3.3 lb)	1.41–1.5 kg
1.6 kg (3.5 lb)	1.51–1.6 kg
1.7 kg (3.7 lb)	1.61–1.7 kg
1.8 kg (4.0 lb)	1.71–1.81 kg
1.9 kg (4.2 lb)	1.81–1.91 kg
2.0 kg (4.4 lb)	1.91–2.03 kg
2.1 kg (4.6 lb)	2.04–2.14 kg
2.3 kg (5.1 lb)	2.15–2.4 kg
2.5 kg (5.5 lb)	2.41–2.75 kg
2.8 kg (6.2 lb)	2.76–3.05 kg
3.1 kg (6.8 lb)	3.06–3.42 kg
3.5 kg (7.7 lb)	3.43–3.99 kg
4.0 kg (8.8 lb)	4.0–4.99 kg
5.5 kg (12 lb)	5.0–6.49 kg
7.2 kg (16 lb)	6.5–7.99 kg
9.1 kg (20 lb)	8.0–9.99 kg
10.7 kg (24 lb)	10–11.99 kg
12.7 kg (28 lb)	12–14.49 kg
14.5 kg (32 lb)	14.5–17.99 kg
18.1 kg (40 lb)	18–20.99 kg
21.7 kg (48 lb)	21–23.99 kg
24 kg (53 lb)	24–28.99 kg
29.5 kg (65 lb)	29 kg and above

Screen resolution

4K or higher
1440p+ (WQHD, QXGA)
1080p+ (Full HD, UXGA)
Better than 768p (SXGA,SXGA+)
600p+ (SVGA, HD, XGA, HD+)
Up to 600p (VGA)

Graphics

Dual standard socket graphics option
Dual proprietary socket graphics option
Standard socket graphics option
Proprietary socket graphics option
Soldered performance graphics option
Soldered midrange graphics option
Soldered mainstream graphics option
Soldered entry graphics option
Integrated entry graphics
Integrated basic graphics

Laptop storage combinations (excluding WWAN slot)

Level	PCIe 4.0 x4	PCIe 3.0 x4	PCIe 3.0 x2	M.2 SATA	mSATA	1.8" SATA	2.5" SATA	1.8" IDE	2.5" IDE
	2019; Not yet (laptops)	2013	2013	2013	2009	2003	2003	1991	1988
	3						2		
	4								
	3						1		
	2						2		
	3					2			
	3								
	2						1		
	4								
	3					1			
	2					2			
	2								
	1						1		
	3								
	2					1			
	1								
	2								
	1					1			
			2				1		
							4		
		1							
			1				1		
							3		
			1						
				1			1		
					1		1		
						1	1		
							2		
									3
						1			
							1		
									2
								1	
									1

Laptop memory

Amount	LPDDR5X	LPDDR5	DDR5	LPDDR4X	LPDDR4	DDR4	LPDDR3	DDR4	DDR3L		DDR3		DDR2		DDR	SDR	EDO	FPM
Amount						dual channel		< dual channel	dual channel	< dual channel	dual channel	< dual channel	dual channel	< dual channel				
Amount	2022 (laptops)	2019 (laptops)	2020	2017	2014	2014	2012	2014	2010		2007		2003		1998	1993	1993	1987
max memory = 512 GB	N/A	N/A	512 GB	N/A	N/A	N/A	N/A	N/A	N/A	N/A	N/A	N/A	N/A	N/A	N/A	N/A	N/A	N/A
max memory = 256 GB	N/A		256 GB (4 slots)	N/A	N/A	N/A	N/A	N/A	N/A	N/A	N/A	N/A	N/A	N/A	N/A	N/A	N/A	N/A
max memory = 128 GB	128 GB		128 GB	N/A	N/A	128 GB (4 slots)	N/A	N/A	N/A	N/A	N/A	N/A	N/A	N/A	N/A	N/A	N/A	N/A
64 GB ≤ max memory < 128 GB		64 GB		N/A	N/A	64 GB	N/A	64 GB (2 slots)	64 GB (4 slots)	N/A	N/A	N/A	N/A	N/A	N/A	N/A	N/A	N/A
32 GB ≤ max memory < 64 GB				32 GB	32 GB	32 GB	N/A		32 GB	32 GB (2 slots)	32 GB (4 slots)	N/A	N/A	N/A	N/A	N/A	N/A	N/A
16 GB ≤ max memory < 32 GB						16 GB	16 GB		16 GB		16 GB	16 GB (2 slots)	16 GB (4 slots)	N/A	N/A	N/A	N/A	N/A
8 GB ≤ max memory < 16 GB						8 GB			8 GB		8 GB		8 GB	8 GB (2 slots)	8 GB (4 slots)	N/A	N/A	N/A
4 GB ≤ max memory < 8 GB						4 GB			4 GB		4 GB		4 GB		4 GB	4 GB (4 slots)	4 GB (4 slots)	N/A
2 GB ≤ max memory < 4 GB						2 GB (8 chips)			2 GB		2 GB		2 GB			2 GB	2 GB	N/A
1 GB ≤ max memory < 2 GB			1 GB (1 chip)	dual channel min	dual channel min	N/A		single channel min	1 GB		1 GB		1 GB					1 GB (4 slots)
512 MB ≤ max memory < 1 GB	N/A	N/A	N/A	single channel min	single channel min	N/A	dual channel min	half channel min	512 MB (8 chips)		512 MB (8 chips)		512 MB					512 MB
256 MB ≤ max memory < 512 MB	N/A	N/A	N/A	256 MB (1 chip)	256 MB (1 chip)	N/A	single channel min	256 MB (1 chip)	N/A	single channel min	N/A	single channel min	256 MB					
128 MB ≤ max memory < 256 MB	N/A	N/A	N/A	N/A	N/A	N/A	128 MB (1 chip)	N/A	N/A	half channel min	N/A	half channel min						
64 MB ≤ max memory < 128 MB	N/A	N/A	N/A	N/A	N/A	N/A	N/A	N/A	N/A	64 MB (1 chip)	N/A	64 MB (1 chip)						
max memory < 64 MB	N/A	N/A	N/A	N/A	N/A	N/A	N/A	N/A	N/A	N/A	N/A	N/A						

=== First generation ===
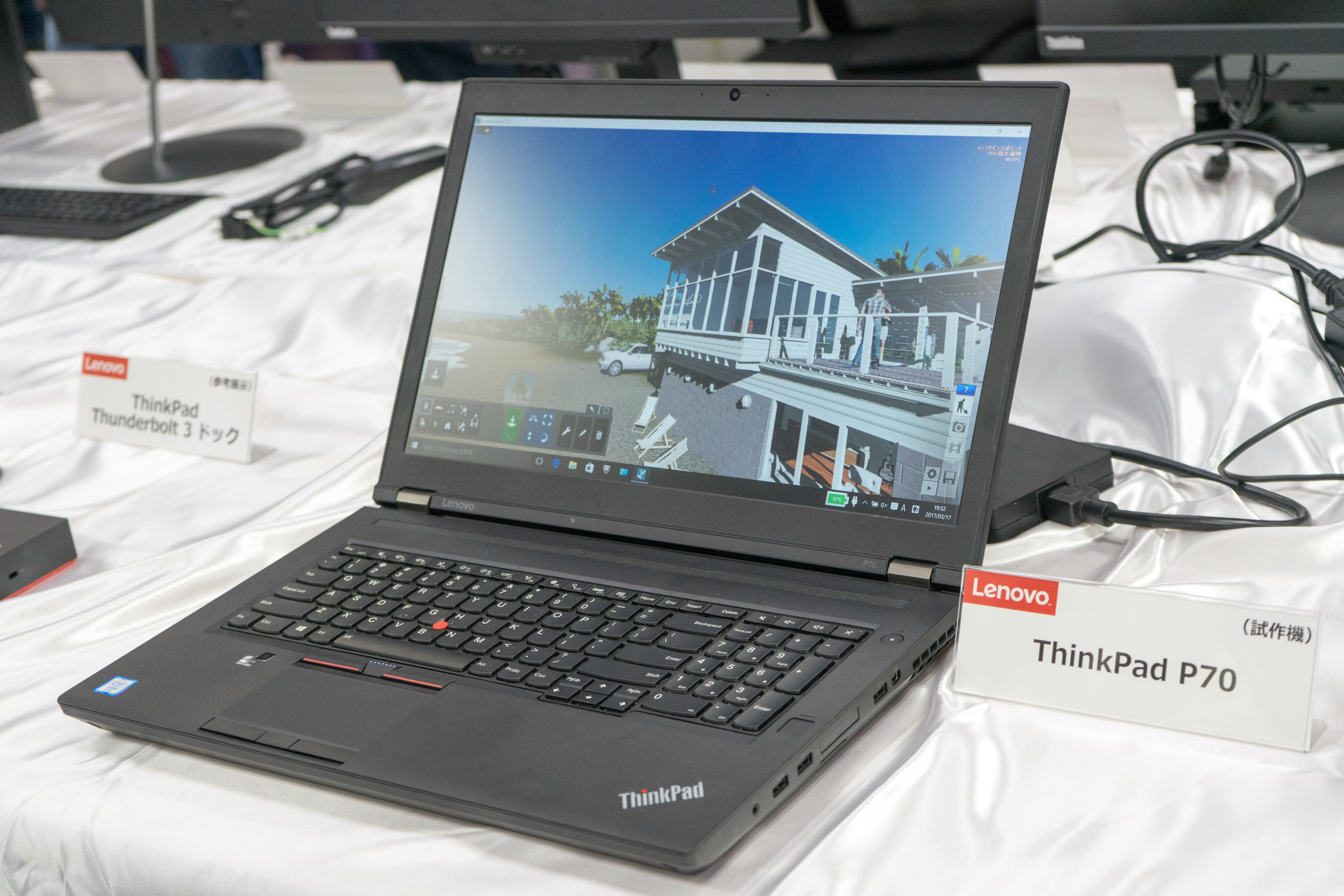
ThinkPad P70

The first generation was announced at Autodesk University 2015 alongside the ThinkStation P310. It comes with a variety of “high-end” options such as Intel Xeon E3-1500M v5 processors, 4K IPS screens and DDR4 ECC RAM up to 64 GB. 1080p screens and 6th generation Core CPUs come standard along with PCI Express SSDs. The P series introduced a cooling system known as FLEX (Full Load Experience) that features two fans connected by a heat pipe and located near the CPU and GPU. A three-button touchpad is included.

==== P40 Yoga ====
P40 Yoga is a version of the ThinkPad Yoga 460 with Nvidia Quadro graphics.

==== P50s ====
ThinkPad P50s is an update of ThinkPad W550s, focused on mobility. Its chassis is based on that of the T560.

==== P50 ====
The ThinkPad P50, while having a 15-inch display, shared little in design with the W541 which it replaced. Its ports had been re-arranged, it was slightly thinner than its predecessor, and it reintroduced indicator lights for hard drive activity. It supports up to three internal storage devices and has a single USB Type-C Thunderbolt 3 port while also featuring Mini DisplayPort and HDMI connections. Weighing 2.5 kilograms and having thickness of 2.6 centimeters, the P50 was lighter than previous W series laptops.

==== P70 ====
The ThinkPad P70 marks the return of 17.3" option in the ThinkPad line. It has up to a Xeon E3-1500M series CPU, an Nvidia Quadro GPU, weighs 3.4 kilograms and is 3.1 centimeters thick. It supports up to four internal storage devices and includes two USB Type-C Thunderbolt 3 ports.

Model	Dimensions (mm)	Weight ^{(min)}	CPU	Chipset	Memory (max)	Graphics	Storage	Display	Battery	Operating System
14.1"
P40 Yoga	19.9 × 338 × 236	1.83 kg (4.0 lb)	6th Gen Intel Core i7-6500U (2C4T 2.5 GHz/3.1GHz Turbo) i7-6600U (2C4T 2.6GHz/3.4GHz Turbo)		16 GB DDR3L 1600MHz (1 slot)	Intel HD 520 + Nvidia Quadro M500M (2 GB DDR3)	One 2.5" SATA Drive	Glare: 2560×1440 IPS Touch Anti-glare: 1920×1080 IPS Touch	m(3) (53 Whr)	Windows 10 Pro Linux Ubuntu Linux
15.6"
P50	377.4 × 252.3 × 24.5–25.9mm (14.9 × 9.9 × 0.96–1.02 in)	2.5 kg (5.5 lb)	6th Gen Intel Core i7-6700HQ (4C8T 2.6 GHz/3.5 GHz Turbo) i7-6820HQ (4C8T 2.7 GHz/3.6 GHz Turbo) Intel Xeon E3-1500M v5 E3-1505M v5 (4C8T 2.8 GHz/3.7 GHz Turbo); E3-1535M v5 (4C8T 2.9 GHz/3.8 GHz Turbo)	Intel; CM236	64 GB DDR4-2133 non-ECC or 64 GB DDR4 ECC (Xeon Processors Only) (4 slots)	Intel HD 530 (Core Processors); Intel HD P530 (Xeon Processors) + Nvidia Quadro M1000M (2 GB or 4 GB GDDR5) or M2000M (4 GB GDDR5)	One 2.5" SATA Drive; Two M.2 x4(NVMe)	1920×1080 IPS; 3840×2160 IPS opt. multitouch	M(6) (66-90 WHr)	Windows 10 Pro Linux Ubuntu Linux
P50	4 USB 3.0, 1 Always-on Charging; 1 HDMI 1.4; 1 mini-DP 1.2; 1 Thunderbolt 3; 1 RJ45 Gigabit Ethernet 1 Docking connector 1 3.5 audio Combo Jack; 1 Smart Card Reader (option); 1 ExpressCard / 34mm 4-in-1 SD card reader (SD/MMC/SDHC/SDXC)									
P50s	380.6 × 258.2 × 22.45mm (15 × 10.2 × 0.9 in)	2.25 kg (5.0 lb)	6th Gen Intel Core i5-6300U (2C4T 2.4GHz/3.0GHz Turbo) i7-6500U (2C4T 2.5GHz/3.1GHz Turbo) i7-6600U (2C4T 2.6GHz/3.4GHz Turbo)		32 GB DDR3L 1600MHz (2 slots)	Intel HD 520 + Nvidia Quadro; M500M (2 GB DDR3)	One 2.5" SATA Drive; Two M.2 x2(NVMe)	1366×768 TN; 1920×1080 IPS; 15.5": 2880×1620 IPS	M(6) (23-72 WHr) m(3) (44 WHr)	Windows 10 Pro Linux Ubuntu Linux
P50s	3 USB 3.0, 1 Always-on Charging; 1 HDMI; 1 mini-DP; 1 RJ45 Gigabit Ethernet 1 Docking connector 1 3.5 audio Combo Jack; 1 Smart Card Reader (option); 4-in-1 SD card reader (MMC/SDHC/SDXC, CPRM not supported); Micro-SIM-card slot									
17.3"
P70	416 × 275.5 × 30–31.5 (16.4 × 10.8 × 1.17–1.2 in)	3.4 kg (7.5 lb)	6th Gen Intel Core i7-6700HQ (4C8T 2.6 GHz/3.5 GHz Turbo) i7-6820HQ (4C8T 2.7 GHz/3.6 GHz Turbo) Intel Xeon E3-1500M v5 E3-1505M v5 (4C8T 2.8 GHz/3.7 GHz Turbo); E3-1575M v5 (4C8T 3 GHz/3.9 GHz Turbo)	Intel; CM236	64 GB DDR4 2133 MHz non-ECC or 64 GB DDR4 ECC (Xeon Processors Only) (4 slots)	Intel HD 530 (Core Processors); Intel HD P530 (E3-1505M v5); Intel Iris Pro P580 (E3-1575M v5) + MXM Nvidia Quadro; M600M (2 GB GDDR5); M3000M (4 GB GDDR5); M4000M (4 GB GDDR5); M5000M (8 GB GDDR5)	One 2.5" SATA Drive; One ThinkPad UltraBay; Two M.2 x4(NVMe)	1920×1080 IPS; 3840×2160 IPS opt. multitouch	M(8) (96 WHr)	Windows 10 Pro Linux Ubuntu Linux
P70	4 USB 3.0, 1 Always-on Charging; 1 HDMI 1.4; 1 mini-DP 1.2; 1 USB-C/Thunderbolt 3; 1 RJ45 Gigabit Ethernet 1 Docking connector 1 3.5 audio Combo Jack; 1 Smart Card Reader (option); 1 ExpressCard / 34mm 4-in-1 SD card reader (SD/MMC/SDHC/SDXC) optical drive ultrabay (option)									

=== Second generation ===
==== P51 ====
A minor update to the P50, which included the updated CM238 chipset and either 7th generation Kaby Lake-H Core i7 processors or Xeon E3-1500M v6 processors.

==== P51s ====
The P51s chassis was based on the T570's. The CPU and integrated chipset was updated to Kaby Lake-U.

==== P71 ====
A minor update to the P70, which included the updated CM238 chipset and either 7th generation Kaby Lake-H Core i7 processors or Xeon E3-1500M v6 processors, as well as Pascal-based Quadro GPUs.

Model	Dimensions (mm)	Weight ^{(min)}	CPU	Chipset	Memory (max)	Graphics	Storage	Display	Battery	Operating System
15.6"
P51	377.4 × 252.8; 24.5 - 29.4mm (regular); 32.7 (touch)	2.55 kg (5.6 lb) or 2.82 kg (6.2 lb)(touch)	6th Gen Intel Core i7 i7-6820HQ (4C8T 2.7 GHz/3.6 GHz Turbo) Intel Xeon E3-1500M v5 E3-1505M v5(4C8T 2.8 GHz/3.7 GHz Turbo); 7th Gen Intel Core i7 i7-7700HQ (4C8T 2.8 GHz/3.8 GHz Turbo) i7-7820HQ (4C8T 2.9 GHz/3.9 GHz Turbo); Intel Xeon E3-1500M v6 E3-1505M v6 (4C8T 3.0 GHz/4.0 GHz Turbo); E3-1535M v6 (4C8T 3.1 GHz/4.1 GHz Turbo)	Intel; CM238	64 GB DDR4 2400 MHz non-ECC or 64 GB DDR4 2400 MHz ECC (Xeon Processors); 2133 MHz for 6th Gen Core and Xeon v5 (4 slots)	Intel HD 530 (6th Gen i7) Intel HD 630 (7th Gen i7); Intel HD P530 (Xeon v5); Intel HD P630 (Xeon v6) + Nvidia Quadro; M520 (2 GB DDR3); M1200 (4 GB GDDR5); M2200 (4 GB GDDR5)	One 2.5" SATA; Two M.2 x4 (NVMe)	1920×1080 IPS; 3840×2160 IPS	M(6) (66-90 WHr)	Windows 10 Pro Linux Ubuntu Linux
P51	4 USB 3.0, 1 Always-on Charging; 1 USB-C/Thunderbolt 3; 1 HDMI; 1 mini-DP; 1 RJ45 Gigabit Ethernet 1 Docking connector (option); 1 3.5 audio Combo Jack; 1 Smart Card Reader (option); SD card reader (MMC/SDHC/SDXC, CPRM not supported); Micro-SIM-card slot (option); ExpressCard slot									
P51s	365.8 × 252.8 × 20 - 20.2mm	2.0 kg (4.4 lb)	6th Gen Intel Core i7-6500U (2C4T 2.5GHz/3.1GHz Turbo) i7-6600U (2C4T 2.6GHz/3.4GHz Turbo); 7th Gen Intel Core i5-7300U (2C4T 2.6GHz/3.5GHz Turbo) i7-7500U (2C4T 2.7GHz/3.5GHz Turbo) i7-7600U (2C4T 2.8GHz/3.9GHz Turbo)		64 GB DDR4 2133 MHz (2 slots)	Intel HD 520 (6th Gen Core); Intel HD 620 (7th Gen Core) + Nvidia Quadro M520 (2 GB GDDR5)	One 2.5" SATA; Two M.2 x4 (NVMe)	1920×1080 IPS; 3840×2160 IPS opt. multitouch	M(6) (24-72 WHr) m(4) (32 WHr)	Windows 10 Pro Linux Ubuntu Linux
P51s	3 USB 3.0, 1 Always-on Charging; 1 USB-C/Thunderbolt 3; 1 HDMI; 1 mini-DP; 1 RJ45 Gigabit Ethernet 1 Docking connector 1 3.5 audio Combo Jack; 1 Smart Card Reader (option); SD card reader (MMC/SDHC/SDXC, CPRM not supported); Micro-SIM-card slot									Windows 10 Pro Linux Ubuntu Linux
17.3"
P71	416 × 275.5 × 30 - 34.2mm (16.4 × 10.8 × 1.2 -1.35 in) (Note: without rubber feet)	3.4 kg (7.5 lb)	7th Gen Intel Core i7-7700HQ (4C8T 2.8 GHz/3.8 GHz Turbo) i7-7820HQ (4C8T 2.9 GHz/3.9 GHz Turbo) Intel Xeon E3-1500M v6 E3-1505M v6 (4C8T 3.0 GHz/4.0 GHz Turbo); E3-1535M v6 (4C8T 3.1 GHz/4.2 GHz Turbo)	Intel; CM238	64 GB DDR4 2400 MHz non-ECC or 64 GB DDR4 2400 MHz ECC (Xeon Processors) (4 slots)	Intel HD 630 (Core Processors); Intel HD P630 (Xeon Processors) + MXM Nvidia Quadro; M620 (2 GB GDDR5); P3000 (6 GB GDDR5); P4000 (8 GB GDDR5); P5000 (16 GB GDDR5)	One 2.5" SATA; One ThinkPad UltraBay; Two M.2 x4(NVMe)	1920×1080 IPS; 3840×2160 IPS	M(8) (96 WHr)	Windows 10 Pro Linux Ubuntu Linux
P71	4 USB 3.0, 1 Always-on Charging; 2 USB-C gen 2/Thunderbolt 3; 1 HDMI 1.4b 1 mini-DP 1.2; 1 RJ45 Gigabit Ethernet 1 Docking connector 1 3.5 audio Combo Jack; 1 Smart Card Reader (option); SD card reader (MMC/SDHC/SDXC, CPRM not supported); Micro-SIM-card slot ExpressCard/34 slot optical drive ultrabay (option)									

=== Third generation ===
==== P1 1st Gen ====
The ThinkPad P1 was based on the first generation of ThinkPad X1 Extreme. It features Intel Xeon E-2100M CPUs and Nvidia Quadro graphics.

==== P52 ====
The P52 was a redesign of the P51, which introduced Coffee Lake-H Core i7 CPUs, all with 6 cores and 12 threads, the CM246 chipset, and Nvidia Quadro Pascal-based GPUs. It removed the mechanical docking port and ExpressCard slot, and features a narrower keyboard which is present on other ThinkPads.

==== P52s ====
Based on the ThinkPad T580, the P52s features a camera shutter, lateral instead of bottom-mounted docking port, and 8th Gen Core i5/i7 low power CPUs. The P52s includes quad-core Kaby Lake-R 15 W CPUs and Nvidia Quadro P500 GPUs.

==== P72 ====
The P72 was a redesign of the P71, with features similar to those of the P52. It also features the narrower keyboard of the P52, and is the first 17.3" ThinkPad with a soldered GPU.

Model	Dimensions (mm)	Weight ^{(min)}	CPU	Chipset	Memory (max)	Graphics	Storage	Display	Battery
15.6"
P1 1st Gen	362 x 245.7 x 18.4mm	1.7 kg (3.7 lb) or 1.8 kg (4.0 lb) (touch)	8th Gen Intel Core i5-8400H (4C8T 2.5 GHz/4.2 GHz Turbo) i7-8750H (6C12T 2.2 GHz/4.1 GHz Turbo) i7-8850H (6C12T 2.6 GHz/4.3 GHz Turbo) Intel Xeon E-2100M; Xeon E-2176M (6C12T 2.7 GHz/4.4 GHz Turbo)	Intel; CM246	64 GB DDR4 2666 MHz (all cpus) or 32 GB DDR4 2666 MHz ECC (Xeon Processors) (2 slots)	Intel UHD 630 (Core i5/i7); Intel UHD P630 (Xeon E) + Nvidia Quadro; P1000 Max-Q (4 GB GDDR5); P2000 Max-Q (4 GB GDDR5)	Two M.2 x4 (NVMe)	1920×1080 IPS; 3840×2160 IPS opt. multitouch	m (80 WHr)
P1 1st Gen	2 USB 3.1 Gen 1 (one Always On), 2 USB Type-C / Thunderbolt 3 (with the Power Delivery and DP), HDMI 2.0, Ethernet extension connector, 1 3.5 audio combo jack, smart card reader (option), 4-in-1 reader (SD/MMC/SDHC/SDXC)								
P52	377.4 × 252.8; 24.5 - 29.4mm (regular); 32.7 (touch)	2.45 kg (5.4 lb) or 2.9 kg (6.4 lb) (touch)	8th Gen Intel Core i7-8750H (6C12T 2.2 GHz/4.1 GHz Turbo) i7-8850H (6C12T 2.6 GHz/4.3 GHz Turbo) i9-8950HK (6C12T 2.9 GHz/4.8 GHz Turbo) Intel Xeon E-2100M; Xeon E-2176M (6C12T 2.7 GHz/4.4 GHz Turbo)	Intel; CM246	128 GB DDR4 2400 MHz or 64 GB ECC (Xeon Processors) (4 slots)	Intel UHD 630 (Core i7/i9); Intel HD P630 (Xeon E) + Nvidia Quadro; P1000 (4 GB GDDR5); P2000 (4 GB GDDR5); P3200 (6 GB GDDR5)	One 2.5" SATA; Two M.2 x4(NVMe)	1920×1080 IPS; 3840×2160 IPS opt. multitouch	M (90 WHr)
P52s	366 × 253 × 20 - 20.2mm	2.0 kg (4.4 lb)	8th Gen Intel Core i5-8350U (4C8T 1.7GHz/3.6GHz Turbo) i7-8550U (4C8T 1.8GHz/4.0GHz Turbo) i7-8650U (4C8T 1.9GHz/4.2GHz Turbo)		64 GB DDR4 2400 MHz (2 slots)	Intel UHD 620 +Nvidia Quadro; P500 (2 GB GDDR5)	One 2.5" SATA or One M.2 x2 (NVMe)	1920×1080 IPS; 3840×2160 IPS opt. multitouch	M(6) (24-72 WHr) m(4) (32 WHr)
17.3"
P72	416 x 281 x 24.5-29.4mm	3.4 kg (7.5 lb)	8th Gen Intel Core i7-8750H (6C12T 2.2 GHz/4.1 GHz Turbo) i7-8850H (6C12T 2.6 GHz/4.3 GHz Turbo); Intel Xeon E-2100M; Xeon E-2176M (6C12T 2.7 GHz/4.4 GHz Turbo); Xeon E-2186M (6C12T 2.9 GHz/4.8 GHz Turbo)	Intel; CM246	128 GB DDR4 2400 MHz non-ECC or 64 GB DDR4-2400 MHz ECC (Xeon E Processors) (4 slots)	Intel UHD 630 (Core i7); Intel HD P630 (Xeon E) + Nvidia Quadro; P600 (4 GB GDDR5); P2000 (4 GB GDDR5); P3200 (6 GB GDDR5); P4200 (8 GB GDDR5); P5200(16 GB GDDR5)	One 2.5" SATA; Two M.2 x4 (NVMe)	1920×1080 IPS; 3840×2160 IPS	m (99 WHr)
P72	4 USB 3.1, 1 Always-on Charging; 2 USB-C gen 2/Thunderbolt 3; 1 HDMI 2.0; 1 mini-DP 1.4; 1 RJ45 Gigabit Ethernet 1 3.5 audio Combo Jack; 1 Smart Card Reader (option); SD card reader (MMC/SDHC/SDXC, CPRM not supported); Micro-SIM-card slot								

=== Fourth generation ===
==== P1 Gen 2 ====
The P1 Gen 2 was an update to the P1 which features Intel 9th Gen Coffee Lake-H Refresh Core i5/i7/i9 and Xeon E-2200M mobile processors and Nvidia Quadro Turing-based series GPUs.

==== P43s ====
Based in the ThinkPad T490, the ThinkPad P43s has a 14-inch screen. It features Intel 8th Gen Coffee Lake U-series processors and Nvidia Quadro Pascal-based graphics.

==== P53 ====
A redesign of the P52, the P53 features a 4K UHD OLED Touch display, Wi-Fi 6, Intel 9th Gen Coffee Lake Refresh Core i5/i7/i9 and Xeon E-2200M mobile processors and Nvidia Quadro RTX Turing-based GPUs.

==== P53s ====
The P53s is an update to the P52s, which features Intel 8th Gen Coffee Lake U-series Processors, Nvidia Quadro P520 Graphics and up to 4K UHD (3840 x 2160) display, available with Dolby Vision high dynamic range (HDR) technology.

==== P73 ====
The P73 was a redesign of the P72, with hardware upgrades similar to those of the P53. The P73 features new Intel 9th Gen Coffee Lake Refresh CPUs and Nvidia Quadro RTX Turing GPUs.

Model	Dimensions (mm)	Weight ^{(min)}	CPU	Chipset	Memory (max)	Graphics	Storage	Display	Battery	Operating System
14"
P43s	329 x 227 x 17.9mm 12.95 x 8.94 x 0.70 Inches	1.47 kg (3.2 lb) or 1.55 kg (3.4 lb) (WQHD/FHD)	8th Gen Intel Core i5-8365U (4C8T 1.6GHz/4.1GHz Turbo) i7-8565U (4C8T 1.8GHz/4.6GHz Turbo) i7-8665U (4C8T 1.9GHz/4.8GHz Turbo)		48 GB DDR4 2400MHz (8/16GB soldered, 1 slot)	Intel UHD 620 + Nvidia Quadro; P520 (2 GB GDDR5)	One M.2 x4 (NVMe)	1920×1080 IPS; 2560x1440 IPS opt. multitouch	m (50 WHr)	Windows 10 Pro Linux Ubuntu Linux
15.6"
P1 Gen 2	361.8 x 245.7 x 18.4mm 14.24 x 9.67 x 0.72 Inches	1.7 kg (3.7 lb) or 1.81 kg (4.0 lb) (touch)	9th Gen Intel Core i5-9400H (4C8T 2.5 GHz/4.3 GHz Turbo) i7-9750H (6C12T 2.6 GHz/4.5 GHz Turbo) i7-9850H (6C12T 2.6 GHz/4.6 GHz Turbo) i9-9880H (8C16T 2.3 GHz/4.8 GHz Turbo) Intel Xeon E-2200M; Xeon E-2276M (6C12T 2.8 GHz/4.7 GHz Turbo)	Intel; CM246	64 GB DDR4 2666 MHz non-ECC or 64 GB DDR4 2666 MHz ECC (Xeon Processors) (2 slots)	Intel UHD 630 (Core i5/i7); Intel UHD P630 (Xeon E) + Nvidia Quadro; T1000 (4 GB GDDR5); T2000 (4 GB GDDR5)	Two M.2 x4 (NVMe)	1920×1080 IPS; 3840×2160 IPS opt. multitouch	m (80 WHr)	Windows 10 Pro Linux Ubuntu Linux
P53	Non-touch models: 377.4 x 252.3 x 24.5-29.4 mm (14.86 x 9.93 x 0.96-1.16 inches); Touch models: 377.4 x 252.3 x 25.8-30.7 mm (14.86 x 9.93 x 1.02-1.21 inches)	2.5 kg (5.5 lb) or 2.9 kg (6.4 lb) (touch)	9th Gen Intel Core i5-9400H (4C8T 2.5 GHz/4.3 GHz Turbo) i7-9750H (6C12T 2.6 GHz/4.5 GHz Turbo) i7-9850H (6C12T 2.6 GHz/4.6 GHz Turbo) i9-9880H (8C16T 2.3 GHz/4.8 GHz Turbo) Intel Xeon E-2200M; Xeon E-2276M (6C12T 2.8 GHz/4.7 GHz Turbo)	Intel; CM246	128 GB DDR4 2666 MHz non-ECC or 128 GB DDR4 2666 MHz ECC (Xeon Processors) (4 slots)	Intel UHD 630 (Core i5/i7/i9); Intel HD P630 (Xeon E) + Nvidia Quadro; T1000 (4 GB GDDR5); T2000 (4 GB GDDR5); RTX 3000 (6 GB GDDR6); RTX 4000 Max-Q (8 GB GDDR6); RTX 5000 Max-Q (16 GB GDDR6)	One 2.5" SATA and Two M.2 x4(NVMe) OR Three M.2 x4(NVMe)	1920×1080 IPS; 3840×2160 IPS; 3840×2160 OLED multi-touch	m (90 WHr)	Windows 10 Pro Linux Ubuntu Linux
P53s	365.8 x 248 x 19.1 mm 14.40 x 9.76 x 0.75 Inches	1.75 kg (3.9 lb)	8th Gen Intel Core i5-8365U (4C8T 1.6GHz/4.1GHz Turbo) i7-8565U (4C8T 1.8GHz/4.6GHz Turbo) i7-8665U (4C8T 1.9GHz/4.8GHz Turbo)		48 GB DDR4 2400MHz (8/16GB soldered, 1 slot)	Intel UHD 620 + Nvidia Quadro; P520 (2 GB GDDR5)	One M.2 x4 (NVMe)	1920×1080 IPS; 3840×2160 IPS opt. multitouch	m (57 WHr)	Windows 10 Pro Linux Ubuntu Linux
17.3"
P73	416 x 281 x 25.9–31 mm 16.38 x 11.06 x 1.02-1.22 inches	3.4 kg (7.5 lb)	9th Gen Intel Core i5-9400H (4C8T 2.5 GHz/4.3 GHz Turbo) i7-9750H (6C12T 2.6 GHz/4.5 GHz Turbo) i7-9850H (6C12T 2.6 GHz/4.6 GHz Turbo) i9-9880H (8C16T 2.3 GHz/4.8 GHz Turbo) Intel Xeon E-2200M; Xeon E-2276M (6C12T 2.8 GHz/4.7 GHz Turbo)	Intel; CM246	128 GB DDR4 2666 MHz non-ECC or 128 GB DDR4-2666 MHz ECC (Xeon E Processors) (4 slots)	Intel UHD 630 (Core i5/i7/i9); Intel HD P630 (Xeon E) + Nvidia Quadro; T1000 (4 GB GDDR5); T2000 (4 GB GDDR5); RTX 3000 (6 GB GDDR6); RTX 4000 Max-Q (8 GB GDDR6); RTX 5000 Max-Q (16 GB GDDR6)	One 2.5" SATA and Two M.2 x4(NVMe) OR Three M.2 x4(NVMe)	1920×1080 IPS; 3840×2160 IPS	m (99 WHr)	Windows 10 Pro Linux Ubuntu Linux

=== 2020 - Fifth generation ===
==== P1 Gen 3 ====
Features Nvidia graphics and OLED screen.

==== P15v Gen 1 ====
Based on the ThinkPad T15p Gen 1.

==== P17 Gen 1 ====
Model	Dimensions (mm / in)	Weight ^{(min)}	CPU	Chipset	Memory (max)	Graphics	Storage	Display	Battery	Other	Operating System
14"
P14s Gen 1 (Intel)	329 × 227 × 17.9; 12.95 × 8.94 × 0.70	1.49 kg (3.3 lb)	10th Gen Intel Core i5-10210U i5-10310U i7-10510U i7-10610U i7-10710U i7-10810U		40/48 GB DDR4 — 2666 MHz (8/16 GB soldered, 1 slot)	Intel UHD; Nvidia Quadro P520 (2 GB GDDR6)	One M.2 x4 Drive	1920 × 1080 250 nits 1920 × 1080 Low power 400 nits 1920 × 1080 Touch, 300 / 500 nits 3840 × 2160 Touch Glossy, 500 nits	m 50Wh	One TB3	Windows 10 Pro Linux Ubuntu Linux
P14s Gen 1 (AMD)	329 × 227 × 17.9; 12.95 × 8.94 × 0.70	1.46 kg (3.2 lb)	AMD Ryzen 4000 series Ryzen 7 PRO 4750U		40/48 GB DDR4 — 2666 MHz (8/16 GB soldered, 1 slot)	AMD Radeon Vega	One M.2 x4 Drive	1920 × 1080 250 nits 1920 × 1080 Low power 400 nits 1920 × 1080 Touch, 300 / 500 nits	m 50Wh	Two USB-C	Windows 10 Pro Linux Ubuntu Linux
15.6"											
P1 Gen 3	361.8 × 245.7 × 18.7; 14.24 × 9.67 × 0.74	1.7 kg (3.7 lb)	10th Gen Intel Core i7-10750H i7-10850H i7-10875H i9-10885H Xeon W-10855M	Intel; WM490	64 GB DDR4 — 2933 MHz (2 slots)	Intel UHD; Optional Nvidia Quadro T1000 / T2000 (4 GB GDDR6)	Two M.2 x4 Drive	1920 × 1080 IPS 300 / 500 nits 3840 × 2160 IPS 600 nits 3840 × 2160 OLED Touch 540 nits	m 80Wh	Two TB3	Windows 10 Pro Linux Ubuntu Linux
P15 Gen 1	375.4 × 252.3 × 24.5–31.45; 14.78 × 9.93 × 0.96–1.24	2.74 kg (6.0 lb)	10th Gen Intel Core i5-10400H i7-10750H i7-10850H i7-10875H i9-10885H i9-10980HK; Xeon W-10855M Xeon W-10885M	Intel; WM490	128 GB DDR4 — 2933 MHz (4 slots)	Intel UHD; Optional Nvidia Quadro T1000 / T2000 / RTX 3000 / 4000 / 5000 (4-16 GB GDDR6)	Two M.2 x4 Drives	1920 × 1080 IPS 300 / 500 nits 3840 × 2160 IPS 600 nits 3840 × 2160 OLED Touch 500 nits	m 94Wh	Two TB3	Windows 10 Pro Linux Ubuntu Linux
P15s Gen 1	365.8 × 248 × 19.1; 14.40 × 9.76 × 0.75	1.75 kg (3.9 lb)	10th Gen Intel Core i5-10210U i5-10310U i7-10510U i7-10610U i7-10710U i7-10810U		40/48 GB — DDR4 2666 MHz (8/16 GB soldered, 1 slot)	Intel UHD; Nvidia Quadro P520 (2 GB GDDR6)	One M.2 x4 Drive	1920 × 1080 250 nits 1920 × 1080 Touch, 300 nits 3840 × 2160 Touch, 600 nits	m 57Wh	One TB3	Windows 10 Pro Linux Ubuntu Linux
P15v Gen 1	366.5 × 250 × 22.7; 14.43 × 9.84 × 0.89	2.07 kg (4.6 lb)	10th Gen Intel Core i5-10300U i7-10750H i7-10850H i7-10875H Xeon 10855M	Intel; WM490	64 GB DDR4 — 2933 MHz (2 slots)	Intel UHD; Nvidia Quadro P620 (4 GB GDDR6)	Two M.2 x4 Drive	1920 × 1080 250 nits 1920 × 1080 Touch, 300 nits 3840 × 2160 Touch, 600 nits	m 68Wh	One TB3	Windows 10 Pro Linux Ubuntu Linux
17.3"
P17 Gen 1	415.44 × 280.81 × 25.11–33.25; 16.36 × 11.06 × 0.99–1.31	3.5 kg (7.7 lb)	10th Gen Intel Core i5-10400H i7-10750H i7-10850H i7-10875H i9-10885H i9-10980HK; Xeon W-10855M Xeon W-10955M	Intel; WM490	128 GB DDR4 — 2933 MHz (4 slots)	Intel UHD; Optional Nvidia Quadro T1000 / T2000 / RTX 3000 / 4000 / 5000 (4-16 GB GDDR6)	Two M.2 x4 Drives	1920 × 1080 IPS 300 nits 3840 × 2160 IPS 500 nits	m 94Wh	Two TB3	Windows 10 Pro Linux Ubuntu Linux

=== 2021 - Sixth generation ===
==== P14s Gen 2 (Intel or AMD) ====
The second generation P14s is just an iterative update of the previous model with new AMD Ryzen PRO 5xxx series and Intel 11th gen CPUs. The main difference between the Intel and AMD version is the Thunderbolt with USB 3.1 Gen 1 capabilities of the USB-C ports, which (including the USB-A) are USB 3.2 Gen 2 (no TB) on the AMD model, but also support DisplayPort alternate mode. The AMD and Intel model now also offer the same display panel options, while the aluminium case option is still exclusive to the Intel variant.

==== P1 Gen 4 ====
Like on the ThinkPad X1 Extreme Gen 4, the 15.6" 16:9 IPS/OLED screen has been replaced by a 16" 16:10 one.

==== P17 Gen 2 ====
Model	Dimensions (mm / in)	Weight ^{(min)}	CPU	Chipset	Memory (max)	Graphics	Storage	Display	Battery	Other	Operating System
14"
P14s Gen 2 (Intel)	329 × 227 × 17.9; 12.95 × 8.94 × 0.70	1.469 kg (3.24 lb)	11th Gen Intel Core i5-1135G7 i5-1145G7 i7-1165G7 i7-1185G7		40/48 GB — DDR4 3200 MHz (8/16 GB soldered, 1 slot)	Intel Iris Xe; Optional Nvidia T500 (4 GB GDDR6)	One M.2 x4 Drive	1920 × 1080 300 nits 1920 × 1080 Low power 400 nits 1920 × 1080 Touch, 300 / 500 nits 3840 × 2160 Touch (add on), 500 nits	m 50Wh	Two TB4	Windows 10 Pro Windows 11 Pro Linux Ubuntu Linux
P14s Gen 2 (AMD)	329 × 227 × 17.9; 12.95 × 8.94 × 0.70	1.46 kg (3.2 lb)	AMD Ryzen 5000 series Ryzen 5 PRO 5650U; Ryzen 7 PRO 5850U		40/48 GB — DDR4 3200 MHz (8/16 GB soldered, 1 slot)	AMD Radeon	One M.2 x4 Drive	1920 × 1080 300 nits 1920 × 1080 Low power 400 nits 1920 × 1080 Touch, 300 / 500 nits 3840 × 2160 Touch (add on), 500 nits	m 50Wh	Two USB-C	Windows 10 Pro Windows 11 Pro Linux Ubuntu Linux
15.6"
P15 Gen 2	375.4 × 252.3 × 24.5–31.45; 14.78 × 9.93 × 0.96–1.24	2.87 kg (6.3 lb)	11th Gen Intel Core i5-11500H i7-11800H i7-11850H i9-11950H; Xeon W-11855M Xeon W-11955M	Intel; WM590	128 GB DDR4 — 3200 MHz (4 slots)	Intel UHD; Optional Nvidia T1200 / RTX A2000 / A3000 / A4000 / A5000 (4-16 GB GDDR6)	Three M.2 x4 Drives	1920 × 1080 IPS 300 / 500 nits 3840 × 2160 IPS 600 nits 3840 × 2160 OLED Touch 500 nits	m 94Wh	Two TB4	Windows 10 Pro Windows 11 Pro Linux Ubuntu Linux
P15s Gen 2	365.8 × 248 × 19.1; 14.40 × 9.76 × 0.75	1.75 kg (3.9 lb)	11th Gen Intel Core i5-1135G7 i5-1145G7 i7-1165G7 i7-1185G7		40/48 GB — DDR4 3200 MHz (8/16 GB soldered, 1 slot)	Intel Iris Xe; Optional Nvidia T500 (4 GB GDDR6)	One M.2 x4 Drive	1920 × 1080 IPS 300 nits 1920 × 1080 IPS Touch 300 nits 3840 × 2160 IPS 600 nits	m 57Wh	Two TB4	Windows 10 Pro Windows 11 Pro Linux Ubuntu Linux
P15v Gen 2	366.5 × 250 × 22.7; 14.43 × 9.84 × 0.89	2.07 kg (4.6 lb)	11th Gen Intel Core i5-11400H i7-11800H i7-11850H i9-11950H	Intel; WM590	64 GB DDR4 — 3200 MHz (2 slots)	Intel UHD; Optional Nvidia T600 / T1200 / RTX A2000 (4 GB GDDR6)	Two M.2 x4 Drives	1920 × 1080 IPS 300 nits 3840 × 2160 IPS Touch 300 nits 3840 × 2160 IPS 600 nits	m 68Wh	One TB4	Windows 10 Pro Windows 11 Pro Linux Ubuntu Linux
16"
P1 Gen 4	359.5 × 253.8 × 17.7; 14.15 × 9.99 × 0.70	1.81 kg (4.0 lb)	11th Gen Intel Core i7-11800H i7-11850H i9-11950H Xeon W-11855M	Intel; WM590	64 GB DDR4 — 3200 MHz (2 slots)	Intel UHD; Optional Nvidia RTX 3080 / 3070 / T1200 / A2000 / A3000 / A4000 / A5000 (4-16 GB GDDR6)	One OR Two M.2 x4 Drive	2560 × 1600 IPS 400 nits 3840 × 2400 IPS 600 nits 3840 × 2400 IPS Touch 600 nits	m 90Wh	Two TB4	Windows 10 Pro Windows 11 Pro Linux Ubuntu Linux
17.3"
P17 Gen 2	415.44 × 280.81 × 24.41–32.45; 16.36 × 11.06 × 0.96–1.28	3.564 kg (7.86 lb)	11th Gen Intel Core i5-11500H i7-11800H i7-11850H i9-11950H; Xeon W-11855M Xeon W-11955M	Intel; WM590	128 GB DDR4 — 3200 MHz (4 slots)	Intel UHD; Optional Nvidia T1200 / RTX A2000 / A3000 / A4000 / A5000 (4-16 GB GDDR6)	Three M.2 x4 Drives	1920 × 1080 IPS 300 nits 3840 × 2160 IPS 600 nits	m 94Wh	Two TB4	Windows 10 Pro Windows 11 Pro Linux Ubuntu Linux

=== 2022 - Seventh generation ===
==== P14s Gen 3 (Intel or AMD) ====
Sources:

==== P15v Gen 3 (Intel or AMD) ====
Sources:

==== P1 Gen 5 ====
Features NFC, liquid metal thermal paste, and 16:10 IPS screen options.

==== P16 Gen 1 ====
Replaces both P15 & P17 line models with a single 16:10, 16" screen size in 3 resolutions & a non-touch/multi-touch option for the UHD.

==== P16s Gen 1 (Intel or AMD) ====
Replaces the P15s line with a 16" screen.

Model	Dimensions (mm / in)	Weight ^{(min)}	CPU	Chipset	Memory (max)	Graphics	Storage	Display	Battery	Other	Operating System
14"
P14s Gen 3 (Intel)	317.7 × 226.9 × 17.9; 12.51 × 8.93 × 0.70	1.38–1.5 kg (3.0–3.3 lb)	12th Gen Intel Core i5-1240P i5-1250P i7-1260P i7-1270P i7-1280P		40/48 GB — DDR4 3200 MHz (8/16 GB soldered, 1 slot)	Intel Iris Xe; Optional Nvidia T550 (4 GB GDDR6)	One M.2 x4 Drive	1920 × 1200 300 nits 1920 × 1200 Low power 400 nits 1920 × 1200 Touch (on cell), 300 nits 1920 × 1200 Touch (on cell), 500 nits 2240 × 1400 300 nits 3840 × 2400 Touch (add on), 500 nits	m 39.3Wh; 52.5Wh	Two TB4	Windows 11 Pro Linux Ubuntu Linux
P14s Gen 3 (AMD)	317.7 × 226.9 × 17.9; 12.51 × 8.93 × 0.70	1.4 kg (3.1 lb)	AMD Ryzen 6000 series Ryzen 5 PRO 6650U; Ryzen 7 PRO 6850U		16/32 GB — LPDDR5 6400 MHz (fully soldered)	AMD Radeon 660M / 680M	One M.2 x4 Drive	1920 × 1200 300 nits 1920 × 1200 Touch (on cell), 300 nits 1920 × 1200 Low power 400 nits 3840 × 2400 Touch (add on), 500 nits	m 39.3Wh; 52.5Wh	Two USB-C 10 Gbps w/DP 1.4	Windows 11 Pro Linux Ubuntu Linux
15.6"
P15v Gen 3 (Intel)	366.5 × 250 × 22.7; 14.43 × 9.84 × 0.89	2.26 kg (5.0 lb)	12th Gen Intel Core i5-12500H i7-12800H i7-12700H i9-12900H		64 GB DDR5 — 4800 MHz (2 slots)	Intel Iris Xe; Optional Nvidia T600 / T1200 / RTX A2000 (4 GB GDDR6)	Two M.2 x4 Drive	1920 × 1080 IPS 1920 × 1080 IPS Touch 3840 × 2160 IPS HDR400 Dolby Vision	m 68Wh	One TB4	Windows 11 Pro Linux Ubuntu Linux
P15v Gen 3 (AMD)	366.5 × 250 × 22.7; 14.43 × 9.84 × 0.89	2.26 kg (5.0 lb)	AMD Ryzen 6000 series Ryzen 5 PRO 6650H; Ryzen 7 PRO 6850H		64 GB DDR5 — 4800 MHz (2 slots)	AMD Radeon 660M / 680M; Optional Nvidia T600 / T1200 / RTX A2000 (4 GB GDDR6)	Two M.2 x4 Drive	1920 × 1080 IPS Touch 1920 × 1080 Low Power 1920 × 1080 IPS Touch PrivacyGuard 3840 × 2160 IPS HDR400 Dolby Vision	m 68Wh	One USB4	Windows 11 Pro Linux Ubuntu Linux
16"
P1 Gen 5	359.5 × 253.8 × 17.7; 14.15 × 9.99 × 0.70	1.81 kg (4.0 lb)	12th Gen Intel Core i7-12700H i7-12800H i9-12900H		64 GB DDR5 — 4800 MHz (2 slots)	Intel Iris Xe; Optional Nvidia RTX 3070 Ti / 3080 Ti / A1000 / A2000 / A3000 / A4500 / A5500 (8-16 GB GDDR6)	One OR Two M.2 x4 Drive	1920 × 1200 IPS 300 nits 2560 × 1600 IPS 500 nits 3840 × 2400 IPS 600 nits 3840 × 2400 IPS Touch 600 nits	m 90Wh	Two TB4	Windows 11 Pro Linux Ubuntu Linux
P16 Gen 1	364 × 266 × 30.23; 14.33 × 10.47 × 1.19	2.95 kg (6.5 lb)	12th Gen Intel Core (Alder Lake-HX): i5-12600HX - 12C (4 P-core @2.5GHz/4.6GHz max + 8 E-core @1.8GHz/3.3GHz max) 24T; i7-12800HX - 16C (8 P-core @2.0GHz/4.8GHz max + 8 E-core @1.5GHz/3.4GHz max) 24T; i7-12850HX - 16C (8 P-core @2.1GHz/4.8GHz max + 8 E-core @1.5GHz/3.4GHz max) 24T; i9-12900HX - 16C (8 P-core @2.3GHz/5.0GHz max + 8 E-core @1.7GHz/3.6GHz max) 24T; i9-12950HX - 16C (8 P-core @2.3GHz/5.0GHz max + 8 E-core @1.7GHz/3.6GHz max) 24T	Intel; WM690	128 GB DDR5 — 4800 MHz (4 slots) non-ECC (or ECC on i5-12600HX / i7-12850HX / i9-12950HX models) Due to system limitations 4x32 GB configuration runs at DDR5-3600, while other configurations run at DDR5-4000	Intel UHD; Optional Intel Arc Pro A30M 4 GB / Nvidia RTX A1000 / A2000 / A3000 / A4500 / A5500 (8-16 GB GDDR6)	Two M.2 2280 (NVMe) PCIe 4.0 x4 slot RAID 0/1 support	WUXGA (1920x1200), non-touch, IPS, 300 nits, 1200:1 contrast ratio, 100% sRGB gamut.; WQXGA (2560x1600), non-touch, IPS, 400 nits, 1200:1 contrast ratio, 100% sRGB gamut.; WQUXGA (3840x2400), non-touch, IPS, 600 nits, 1500:1 contrast ratio, 100% Adobe RGB gamut.; WQUXGA (3840x2400), multi-touch, OLED, 400 nits, 100,000:1 contrast ratio, 100% DCI-P3 gamut.	m (94Wh) Li-Polymer		Windows 11 Pro Linux Ubuntu Linux
P16 Gen 1	Standard ports: Models with: integrated or Intel Arc graphics: 1x HDMI, up to 4K/60 Hz; Nvidia discrete graphics: 1x HDMI, up to 8K/60 Hz; 2x USB 3.2 Gen 1 (one Always On); 1x USB-C 3.2 Gen 2 (supports data, PD3.0, DP1.4); 2x Thunderbolt 4 / USB4 40 Gbit/s (supports data, PD3.0, DP1.4); 1x Headphone / microphone combo jack (3.5mm); 1x SD Express 7.0 card reader.; Optional ports: 1x Smart card reader; 1x Nano-SIM card slot (WWAN support models)					Connectivity options: Ethernet: No onboard Ethernet.; WLAN + Bluetooth: Intel Wi-Fi 6E AX211, 802.11ax 2x2 Wi-Fi + BT 5.1 (BT 5.3 hardware ready, but depends on OS support); or; No WLAN and Bluetooth.; WWAN: Fibocom L860-GL-16, 4G LTE CAT16, MIMO 4x4, M.2 card; or; WWAN upgradable to 4G (with antenna ready); or; No WWAN.; NFC: Installed, or not installed.					Windows 11 Pro Linux Ubuntu Linux
P16s Gen 1 (Intel)	362 × 255.5 × 20.5; 14.25 × 10.06 × 0.81	1.8 kg (4.0 lb)	12th Gen Intel Core i5-1240P i5-1250P i7-1260P i7-1270P i7-1280P		40/48 GB — DDR4 3200 MHz (8/16 GB soldered, 1 slot)	Intel Iris Xe; Optional Nvidia T550 (4 GB GDDR6)	One M.2 x4 Drive	1920 × 1200 300 / 400 nits 1920 × 1200 Touch 300 / 500 nits 2560 × 1600 400 nits	m 39.3Wh; 52.5Wh	Two TB4	Windows 11 Pro Linux Ubuntu Linux
P16s Gen 1 (AMD)	362 × 255.5 × 20.5; 14.25 × 10.06 × 0.81	1.81 kg (4.0 lb)	AMD Ryzen 6000 series Ryzen 5 PRO 6650U; Ryzen 7 PRO 6850U		16/32 GB — LPDDR5 6400 MHz (fully soldered)	AMD Radeon 660M / 680M	One M.2 x4 Drive	1920 × 1200 300 / 400 nits 1920 × 1200 Touch 300 / 500 nits 2560 × 1600 400 nits	m 39.3Wh; 52.5Wh	Two USB-C 10 Gbps w/DP 1.4	Windows 11 Pro Linux Ubuntu Linux

=== 2023 - Eighth generation ===
==== P14s Gen 4 (Intel or AMD) ====
Sources:

==== P1 Gen 6 (Intel) ====
Source:

==== P16 Gen 2 (Intel) ====
Source:

==== P16s Gen 2 (Intel or AMD) ====
Sources:

==== P16v Gen 1 (Intel or AMD) ====
Model	Dimensions (mm / in)	Weight ^{(min)}	CPU	Chipset	Memory (max)	Graphics	Storage	Networking	Display	Battery	Other	Operating System
14"
P14s Gen 4 (Intel)	317.7 × 226.9 × 17.9; 12.51 × 8.93 × 0.70	1.34–1.38 kg (3.0–3.0 lb)	13th Gen Intel Core i5-1340P i5-1350P i7-1360P i7-1370P		16/32/64 GB — LPDDR5x 7500 MHz (soldered) 48 GB DDR5 5600 MHz (16 GB soldered, 1 slot)	Intel Iris Xe; Optional Nvidia RTX A500 (4 GB GDDR6)	One M.2 x4 Drive	Gigabit Ethernet Intel Wi-Fi 6E AX211; QC Wi-Fi 6E NFA725A + BT 5.1 / 5.3 HW ready (soldered) Optional WWAN M.2 Card	1920 × 1200 IPS 300 nits 1920 × 1200 IPS Low power 400 nits 1920 × 1200 IPS Touch 300 nits 1920 × 1200 IPS Touch Privacy Guard 500 nits 2240 × 1400 IPS 300 nits 2880 × 1800 X-Rite, 400 nits	m 39.3Wh; 52.5Wh	ThinkShutter; Two TB4	Windows 11 Pro Linux Ubuntu Linux
P14s Gen 4 (AMD)	317.7 × 226.9 × 17.9; 12.51 × 8.93 × 0.70	1.34–1.38 kg (3.0–3.0 lb)	AMD Ryzen 7040 series Ryzen 5 PRO 7540U (6C12T 3.2/4.9 GHz Turbo); Ryzen 7 PRO 7840U (8C16T 3.3/5.1 GHz Turbo)		16/32/64 GB — LPDDR5x 7500 MHz (soldered)	AMD Radeon 740M / 780M	One M.2 x4 Drive	Gigabit Ethernet MT Wi-Fi 6E RZ616; QC Wi-Fi 6E NFA725A + BT 5.1(soldered) Optional WWAN M.2 Card	1920 × 1200 IPS 300 nits 1920 × 1200 IPS Low power 400 nits 1920 × 1200 IPS Touch 300 nits 1920 × 1200 IPS Touch Privacy Guard 500 nits 2880 × 1800 X-Rite, 400 nits	m 39.3Wh; 52.5Wh	ThinkShutter; One USB4, One USB-C 3.2 Gen 2 10 Gbps	Windows 11 Pro Linux Ubuntu Linux
16"
P1 Gen 6 (Intel)	359.5 × 253.8 × 17.3; 14.15 × 9.99 × 0.68	1.78–1.86 kg (3.9–4.1 lb)	13th Gen Intel Core i7-13700H i7-13800H i9-13900H		96 GB DDR5 — 5600 MHz (2 slots)	Intel Iris Xe; Optional Nvidia RTX 4060 / 4080 / 4090 / A1000 / Ada: A2000 / A3500 / A4000 / A5000 (6-16 GB GDDR6)	One OR Two M.2 x4 Drive	No Onboard Ethernet Intel Wi-Fi 6E AX211; BT 5.1 / 5.3 HW ready (soldered); Optional WWAN M.2 Card	1920 × 1200 IPS 300 nits 2560 × 1600 IPS 500 nits 3840 × 2400 OLED Film Touch 400/500 nits	m 90Wh	Two TB4	Windows 11 Pro Linux Ubuntu Linux
P16 Gen 2	364 × 266 × 30.23; 14.33 × 10.47 × 1.19	2.95 kg (6.5 lb)	13th Gen Intel Core i5-13600HX vPro i7-13700HX i7-13850HX vPro i9-13950HX vPro i9-13980HX	Intel; WM790	192 GB DDR5 — 5600 MHz (4 slots)	Intel UHD; Optional Intel Arc Pro A30M / Nvidia RTX A1000 / Ada: 2000 / 3500 / 4000 / 5000 (4-16 GB GDDR6)	Two M.2 x4 Drive	No Onboard Ethernet Intel Wi-Fi 6E AX211; BT 5.1 / 5.3 HW ready (soldered); Optional WWAN M.2 Card	1920 × 1200 IPS 300 nits 2560 × 1600 IPS 500 nits 3840 × 2400 IPS 800 nits 3840 × 2400 OLED Film Touch 400/500 nits	m 90Wh	Two TB4	Windows 11 Pro Linux Ubuntu Linux
P16s Gen 2 (Intel)	361.98 × 255.5 × 20.5; 14.25 × 10.06 × 0.81	1.70–1.73 kg (3.7–3.8 lb)	13th Gen Intel Core i5-1340P i5-1350P i7-1360P i7-1370P		16/32/64 GB — LPDDR5x 7500 MHz (soldered) 48 GB DDR5 5600 MHz (16 GB soldered, 1 slot)	Intel Iris Xe; Optional Nvidia RTX A500 (4 GB GDDR6)	One M.2 x4 Drive	Gigabit Ethernet Intel Wi-Fi 6E AX211; QC Wi-Fi 6E NFA725A + BT 5.1 / 5.3 HW ready (soldered) Optional WWAN M.2 Card	1920 × 1200 IPS 300 nits 1920 × 1200 IPS Low power 400 nits 1920 × 1200 IPS Touch 300 nits 3840 × 2400 OLED X-Rite, 400 nits	m 52.5Wh; 86Wh	ThinkShutter; Two TB4	Windows 11 Pro Linux Ubuntu Linux
P16s Gen 2 (AMD)	361.98 × 255.5 × 20.5; 14.25 × 10.06 × 0.81	1.70–1.74 kg (3.7–3.8 lb)	AMD Ryzen 7040 series Ryzen 5 PRO 7540U (6C12T 3.2/4.9 GHz Turbo); Ryzen 7 PRO 7840U (8C16T 3.3/5.1 GHz Turbo)		16/32/64 GB — LPDDR5x 7500 MHz (soldered)	AMD Radeon 740M / 780M	One M.2 x4 Drive	Gigabit Ethernet MT Wi-Fi 6E RZ616; QC Wi-Fi 6E NFA725A + BT 5.1(soldered) Optional WWAN M.2 Card	1920 × 1200 IPS 300 nits 1920 × 1200 IPS Low power 400 nits 1920 × 1200 IPS Touch 300 nits 3840 × 2400 OLED X-Rite, 400 nits	m 52.5Wh; 86Wh	ThinkShutter; One USB4, One USB-C 3.2 Gen 2 10 Gbps	Windows 11 Pro Linux Ubuntu Linux
P16v Gen 1 (Intel)	365 × 262 × 24.66; 14.37 × 10.31 × 0.97	2.2 kg (4.9 lb)	13th Gen Intel Core; Core i5-13500H; Core i7-13700H; Core i7-13800H; Core i9-13900H		64 GB; DDR5 (2x32) 2800 MHz	Intel Iris Xe; Optional Nvidia RTX 2000 (8 GB GDDR6)	Two M.2 x4 Drive	Intel Wi-Fi Wi-Fi 6E AX211 + BT 5.3(soldered) Optional WWAN M.2 Card	1920 × 1200 IPS 300 nits 1920 × 1200 IPS Touch 300 nits 3840 × 2400 OLED X-Rite, 800 nits	m 90Wh	Two USB 3.2, One HDMI 2.1; Two USB-C; Thunderbolt 4	Windows 11 Pro Linux Ubuntu Linux
P16v Gen 1 (AMD)	365 × 262 × 24.66; 14.37 × 10.31 × 0.97	2.2 kg (4.9 lb)	AMD Ryzen PRO 7040HS; Ryzen 5 PRO 7640HS; Ryzen 7 7840HS; Ryzen 7 PRO 7840HS; Ryzen 9 PRO 7940HS		64 GB; DDR5 (2x32) 2600 MHz	AMD Radeon 760M / 780M; Optional Nvidia RTX 2000 (8 GB GDDR6)	Two M.2 x4 Drive	Qualcomm Wi-Fi Wi-Fi 6E NFA725A + BT 5.3(soldered) Optional WWAN M.2 Card	1920 × 1200 IPS 300 nits 1920 × 1200 IPS Touch 300 nits 3840 × 2400 OLED X-Rite, 800 nits	m 90Wh	Two USB4, Two USB-C 3.2 Gen 2 40 Gbps	Windows 11 Pro Linux Ubuntu Linux

=== 2024 ===
On April 23, 2024, Lenovo announced four P series laptops. The ThinkPad P1 Gen 7 is the first computer, and laptop, using CAMM2 memory modules.

Model	Dimensions (mm / in)	Weight ^{(min)}	CPU	Chipset	Memory (max)	Graphics	Storage	Networking	Display	Battery	Other	Operating System
14"
P14s Gen 5 (Intel)	325.5 × 227.6 × 18.5; 12.81 × 8.96 × 0.73	1.61 kg (3.5 lb)	Intel Core Ultra; Core Ultra 5 125H; Core Ultra 5 135H; Core Ultra 7 155H; Core Ultra 7 165H; Core Ultra 9 185H		96 GB; DDR5 (2x48) 2800 MHz SO-DIMM	Intel Arc Graphics; Optional Nvidia RTX A500 (4 GB GDDR6)	One M.2 2280 PCIe 4.0 x4 Slot	Gigabit Ethernet Intel Wi-Fi 6E AX211 + BT 5.3(soldered) Optional WWAN M.2 Card	1920 × 1200 IPS 300 nits 2560 × 1600 IPS 90Hz 350 nits 2560 × 1600 IPS 90Hz Add-on Film Touch 350 nits 3072 × 1920 IPS 120Hz 430 nits	m 57Wh; 75Wh	Two USB 3.2, One HDMI 2.1; Two TB4 / USB4	Windows 11 Pro Linux Ubuntu Linux
P14s Gen 5 (AMD)	315.9 × 223.7 × 17.7; 12.44 × 8.81 × 0.70	1.31 kg (2.9 lb)	AMD Ryzen PRO 8040HS; Ryzen 5 PRO 8640HS; AMD Ryzen 7 PRO 8840HS		96 GB; DDR5 (2x48) 2800 MHz SO-DIMM	AMD Radeon 760M / 780M	One M.2 2280 PCIe 4.0 x4 Slot	Gigabit Ethernet QC Wi-Fi 6E NFA725A + BT 5.3(soldered) Optional WWAN M.2 Card	1920 × 1200 IPS 400 nits 1920 × 1200 IPS Touch 400 nits 1920 × 1200 IPS 100% sRGB 400 nits 1920 × 1200 IPS Privacy Guard 500 nits 2880 × 1800 OLED 120Hz 430 nits	m 39.3Wh; 52.5Wh	Two USB 3.2, One HDMI 2.1; Two TB4 / USB4	Windows 11 Pro Linux Ubuntu Linux
16"
P1 Gen 7	354.4 × 241.2 × 17.05; 13.95 × 9.50 × 0.67	1.82 kg (4.0 lb)	Intel Core Ultra; Core Ultra 5 135H; Core Ultra 7 155H; Core Ultra 7 165H; Core Ultra 9 185H		64 GB; LPDDR5x 3750 MHz LPCAMM2	Intel Arc Graphics; Optional Nvidia RTX 4060 / 4070 / A1000 / A2000 / A3000 (8 GB GDDR6)	Two M.2 2280 PCIe 4.0 x4 Slot	Intel Wi-Fi Wi-Fi 7 BE200 + BT 5.4(soldered)	1920 × 1200 IPS 60Hz 400 nits 2560 × 1600 IPS 165Hz 500 nits 3840 × 2400 OLED 60Hz Add-on Film Touch 500 nits DisplayHDR 400	m 90Wh	One USB 3.2, One USB-C 10Gbps, One HDMI 2.1; Two TB4 / USB4, One SD Express card reader	Windows 11 Pro Linux Ubuntu Linux
P16s Gen 3 (Intel)	361.5 × 248.6 × 21.13; 14.23 × 9.79 × 0.83	1.82 kg (4.0 lb)	Intel Core Ultra; Core Ultra 5 125H; Core Ultra 5 135H; Core Ultra 7 155H; Core Ultra 7 165H; Core Ultra 9 185H		96 GB; DDR5 (2x48) 2800 MHz SO-DIMM	Intel Arc Graphics; Optional Nvidia RTX A500 (4 GB GDDR6)	One M.2 2280 PCIe 4.0 x4 Slot	Gigabit Ethernet Intel Wi-Fi 6E AX211 + BT 5.3(soldered) Optional WWAN M.2 Card	1920 × 1200 IPS 300 nits 1920 × 1200 IPS Touch 300 nits 1920 × 1200 IPS 100% sRGB 400 nits 3840 × 2400 OLED 400 nits	m 57Wh; 75Wh	Two USB 3.2, One HDMI 2.1; Two TB4 / USB4	Windows 11 Pro Linux Ubuntu Linux
P16v Gen 2 (Intel)	365 × 262 × 24.66; 14.37 × 10.31 × 0.97	2.22 kg (4.9 lb)	Intel Core Ultra; Core Ultra 7 155H; Core Ultra 7 165H; Core Ultra 9 185H		96 GB; DDR5 (2x48) 2800 MHz SO-DIMM	Intel Arc Graphics; Optional Nvidia RTX A500 / A2000 / A3000 (4-8 GB GDDR6)	Two M.2 2280 PCIe 4.0 x4 Slot	Gigabit Ethernet Intel Wi-Fi 6E AX211 + BT 5.3(soldered) Optional WWAN M.2 Card	1920 × 1200 IPS 300 nits 1920 × 1200 IPS Touch 300 nits 1920 × 1200 IPS 100% sRGB 400 nits 3840 × 2400 IPS 800 nits	m 90Wh	One USB 3.2, One HDMI 2.1; Two TB4 / USB4, One SD Express card reader	Windows 11 Pro Linux Ubuntu Linux

=== 2025 ===
Model	Dimensions (mm / in)	Weight ^{(min)}	CPU	Chipset	Memory (max)	Graphics	Storage	Networking	Display	Battery	Other	Operating System
14"
P14s Gen 6 (Intel)	325.5 × 227.6 × 11.2; 12.81 × 8.96 × 0.44	1.60 kg (3.5 lb)	Intel Core Ultra 200H; Core Ultra 5 225H; Core Ultra 5 235H; Core Ultra 7 255H; Core Ultra 7 265H; Core Ultra 9 285H		96 GB; DDR5 (2x48) 3200 MHz SO-DIMM	Intel Arc 130T / 140T; Optional Nvidia RTX PRO 500 / RTX PRO 1000 (6-8 GB GDDR7)	One M.2 2280 PCIe 4.0 x4 Slot	Gigabit Ethernet Intel Wi-Fi 7 BE201 + BT 5.4(soldered)	1920 × 1200 IPS 60Hz 400 nits 1920 × 1200 IPS Add-on Film Touch 60Hz 400 nits 2560 × 1600 IPS 90Hz 400 nits 3072 × 1920 IPS 120Hz 500 nits	m 57Wh; 75Wh	Two USB 3.2, Two TB4, One HDMI 2.1	Windows 11 Pro; Linux; Ubuntu Linux
P14s Gen 6 (AMD)	315.9 × 223.7 × 10.9; 12.44 × 8.81 × 0.43	1.39 kg (3.1 lb)	AMD Ryzen AI PRO 300; Ryzen AI 5 PRO 340; Ryzen AI 7 PRO 350; Ryzen AI 9 HX PRO 370		96 GB; DDR5 (2x48) 3200 MHz SO-DIMM	AMD Radeon 840M / 860M / 890M	One M.2 2280 PCIe 4.0 x4 Slot	Gigabit Ethernet MediaTek Wi-Fi 7 MT7925 + BT 5.4(soldered) Optional WWAN M.2 Card	1920 × 1200 IPS 400 nits 1920 × 1200 IPS Touch 400 nits 1920 × 1200 IPS 100% sRGB 500 nits 1920 × 1200 IPS 100% sRGB Touch 500 nits 2880 × 1800 OLED Add-on Film Touch 500 nits	m 52.5Wh; 57Wh	Two USB 3.2, Two TB4, One HDMI 2.1	Windows 11 Pro; Linux; Ubuntu Linux
16"
P1 Gen 8	354.3 × 241 × 9.9; 13.95 × 9.49 × 0.39	1.84 kg (4.1 lb)	Intel Core Ultra 200H; Core Ultra 5 235H; Core Ultra 7 255H; Core Ultra 7 265H; Core Ultra 9 285H		64 GB; LPDDR5x 3750 MHz LPCAMM2	Intel Arc 140T; Optional Nvidia RTX PRO 1000 / RTX PRO 2000 (8 GB GDDR7)	Two M.2 2280 PCIe 4.0 x4 Slots	No Onboard Ethernet Intel Wi-Fi 7 BE201 + BT 5.4(soldered)	1920 × 1200 IPS 60Hz 500 nits 3840 × 2400 IPS 60Hz 800 nits 3200 × 2000 OLED 120Hz Add-on Film Touch 1500 nits peak	m 90Wh	One USB 3.2, One HDMI 2.1; One SD Express card reader One TB4, Two TB5	Windows 11 Pro; Linux; Ubuntu Linux
P16s Gen 4 (Intel)	361.5 × 248.6 × 12.6; 14.23 × 9.79 × 0.50	1.82 kg (4.0 lb)	Intel Core Ultra 200H; Core Ultra 5 225H; Core Ultra 5 235H; Core Ultra 7 255H; Core Ultra 7 265H; Core Ultra 9 285H		96 GB; DDR5 (2x48) 3200 MHz SO-DIMM	Intel Arc 130T / 140T; Optional Nvidia RTX PRO 500 / RTX PRO 1000 (6-8 GB GDDR7)	One M.2 2280 PCIe 4.0 x4 Slot	Gigabit Ethernet Intel Wi-Fi 7 BE201 + BT 5.4(soldered) Optional WWAN M.2 Card	1920 × 1200 IPS 400 nits 1920 × 1200 IPS 100% sRGB 500 nits 3840 × 2400 OLED Add-on Film Touch 400 nits	m 57Wh; 75Wh	Two USB 3.2, One HDMI 2.1; Two TB4	Windows 11 Pro; Linux; Ubuntu Linux
P16s Gen 4 (AMD)	359.7 × 251.7 × 11.8; 14.16 × 9.91 × 0.46	1.71 kg (3.8 lb)	AMD Ryzen AI PRO 300; Ryzen AI 5 PRO 340; Ryzen AI 7 PRO 350; Ryzen AI 9 HX PRO 370		96 GB; DDR5 (2x48) 3200 MHz SO-DIMM	AMD Radeon 840M / 860M / 890M	One M.2 2280 PCIe 4.0 x4 Slot	Gigabit Ethernet MediaTek Wi-Fi 7 MT7925 + BT 5.4(soldered) Optional WWAN M.2 Card	1920 × 1200 IPS 400 nits 1920 × 1200 IPS Touch 400 nits 1920 × 1200 IPS 100% sRGB 500 nits 3840 × 2400 OLED Add-on Film Touch 400 nits	m 52.5Wh; 86Wh	Two USB 3.2, One HDMI 2.1; Two TB4	Windows 11 Pro; Linux; Ubuntu Linux
P16v Gen 3 (Intel)	361.5 × 248.6 × 12.8; 14.23 × 9.79 × 0.50	2.1 kg (4.6 lb)	Intel Core Ultra 200H; Core Ultra 5 225H; Core Ultra 7 255H; Core Ultra 7 265H; Core Ultra 9 285H		96 GB; DDR5 (2x48) 3200 MHz SO-DIMM	Nvidia RTX PRO 500 / RTX PRO 1000 / RTX PRO 2000 (6-8 GB GDDR7)	Two M.2 2280 PCIe 4.0 x4 Slots	Gigabit Ethernet Intel Wi-Fi 7 BE201 + BT 5.4(soldered) Optional WWAN M.2 Card	1920 × 1200 IPS 400 nits 1920 × 1200 IPS 100% sRGB 500 nits 3840 × 2400 OLED Add-on Film Touch 400 nits	m 90Wh	Two USB 3.2, One HDMI 2.1; Two TB4 / USB4, One SD Express card reader	Windows 11 Pro; Linux; Ubuntu Linux
P16 Gen 3	362 × 252 × 15.8; 14.25 × 9.92 × 0.62	2.54 kg (5.6 lb)	Intel Core Ultra 200HX; Core Ultra 5 245HX; Core Ultra 7 255HX; Core Ultra 7 265HX; Core Ultra 9 275HX; Core Ultra 9 285HX		192 GB; DDR5 (4x48) 3200 MHz SO-DIMM	Nvidia RTX PRO 1000 / 2000 / 3000 / 4000 / 5000 (8-24 GB GDDR7)	One M.2 2280 PCIe 5.0 x4 Slot, Two M.2 2280 PCIe 4.0 x4 Slots	2.5Gb Ethernet Intel Wi-Fi 7 BE200 + BT 5.4(soldered) Optional WWAN M.2 Card	1920 × 1200 IPS 60Hz 500 nits 3840 × 2400 IPS 60Hz 800 nits 3200 × 2000 OLED 120Hz Add-on Film Touch 1500 nits peak	m 99.9Wh	Two USB 3.2, One HDMI 2.1; One SD Express card reader One TB4, Two TB5	Windows 11 Pro; Linux; Ubuntu Linux

=== 2026 ===
Model	Dimensions (mm / in)	Weight ^{(min)}	CPU	Chipset	Memory (max)	Graphics	Storage	Networking	Display	Battery	Other	Operating System
14"
P14s Gen 7 (Intel)	325.2 × 226.3 × 22.2; 12.80 × 8.91 × 0.87	1.63 kg (3.6 lb)	Intel Core Ultra 300H; Core Ultra 5 336H; Core Ultra 7 356H; Core Ultra 7 366H; Core Ultra 9 386H; Core Ultra X9 378H; Core Ultra X9 388H		96 GB; LPDDR5x 4266 MHz LPCAMM2	Intel Graphics / Intel Arc B390 (X9 models); Optional Nvidia RTX PRO 500 / RTX PRO 1000 (6-8 GB GDDR7)	One M.2 2280 PCIe 5.0 x4 Slot	Gigabit Ethernet Intel Wi-Fi 7 BE211 + BT 5.4(soldered) Optional WWAN M.2 Card	1920 × 1200 IPS 60Hz 400 nits 1920 × 1200 IPS Touch 60Hz 400 nits 3072 × 1920 IPS 120Hz VRR 500 nits	m 60Wh; 75Wh	Two USB 3.2, Two TB4, One HDMI 2.1	Windows 11 Pro; Linux; Ubuntu Linux
P14s Gen 7 (AMD)	313.6 × 221.7 × 22.6; 12.35 × 8.73 × 0.89	1.29 kg (2.8 lb)	AMD Ryzen AI PRO 400; Ryzen AI 5 PRO 440; Ryzen AI 7 PRO 450; Ryzen AI 9 HX PRO 470		96 GB; DDR5 (2x48) 2800 MHz SO-DIMM	AMD Radeon 840M / 860M / 890M	One M.2 2280 PCIe 4.0 x4 Slot	Gigabit Ethernet MediaTek Wi-Fi 7 MT7925 + BT 5.4(soldered) Optional WWAN M.2 Card	1920 × 1200 IPS 400 nits 1920 × 1200 IPS In-Cell Touch 500 nits 1920 × 1200 IPS On-Cell Touch 500 nits 2880 × 1800 OLED 120Hz VRR 500 nits	m 60Wh; 75Wh	Two USB 3.2, Two TB4, One HDMI 2.1	Windows 11 Pro; Linux; Ubuntu Linux
16"
P1 Gen 9	354.4 × 241.2 × 20.6; 13.95 × 9.50 × 0.81	1.77 kg (3.9 lb)	Intel Core Ultra 300H; Core Ultra 5 336H; Core Ultra 7 356H; Core Ultra 7 366H; Core Ultra 9 386H; Core Ultra X9 378H; Core Ultra X9 388H		96 GB; LPDDR5x 4266 MHz LPCAMM2	Intel Graphics / Intel Arc B390 (X9 models); Optional Nvidia RTX PRO 1000 / RTX PRO 2000 (8 GB GDDR7)	One M.2 2280 PCIe 5.0 x4 Slot, One M.2 2280 PCIe 4.0 x4 Slot	No Onboard Ethernet Intel Wi-Fi 7 BE211 + BT 5.4(soldered) Optional WWAN M.2 Card	1920 × 1200 IPS 60Hz 500 nits 3840 × 2400 IPS 60Hz 800 nits 3200 × 2000 OLED 120Hz VRR Add-on Film Touch 1500 nits peak	m 90Wh; 99Wh	One USB 3.2, One HDMI 2.1; One SD Express card reader One TB4, Two TB5	Windows 11 Pro; Linux; Ubuntu Linux
P16s Gen 5 (Intel)	357.9 × 247.9 × 23.3; 14.09 × 9.76 × 0.92	1.79 kg (3.9 lb)	Intel Core Ultra 300H; Core Ultra 5 336H; Core Ultra 7 356H; Core Ultra 7 366H; Core Ultra 9 386H; Core Ultra X9 378H; Core Ultra X9 388H		96 GB; LPDDR5x 4266 MHz LPCAMM2	Intel Graphics / Intel Arc B390 (X9 models); Optional Nvidia RTX PRO 500 / 1000 / RTX PRO 2000 (6-8 GB GDDR7)	One M.2 2280 PCIe 5.0 x4 Slot	Gigabit Ethernet Intel Wi-Fi 7 BE211 + BT 5.4(soldered) Optional WWAN M.2 Card	1920 × 1200 IPS 400 nits 1920 × 1200 IPS Touch 500 nits 2880 × 1800 OLED 120Hz VRR 500 nits	m 60Wh; 90Wh	Two USB 3.2, One HDMI 2.1; Two TB4	Windows 11 Pro; Linux; Ubuntu Linux
P16s Gen 5 (AMD)	357.9 × 247.9 × 23.3; 14.09 × 9.76 × 0.92	1.75 kg (3.9 lb)	AMD Ryzen AI PRO 400; Ryzen AI 5 PRO 440; Ryzen AI 7 PRO 450; Ryzen AI 9 HX PRO 470		96 GB; LPDDR5x 4266 MHz LPCAMM2	AMD Radeon 840M / 860M / 890M; Optional Nvidia RTX PRO 500 / 1000 / RTX PRO 2000 (6-8 GB GDDR7)	One M.2 2280 PCIe 5.0 x4 Slot	Gigabit Ethernet MediaTek Wi-Fi 7 MT7925 + BT 5.4(soldered) Optional WWAN M.2 Card	1920 × 1200 IPS 400 nits 1920 × 1200 IPS Touch 500 nits 2880 × 1800 OLED 120Hz VRR 500 nits	m 60Wh; 90Wh	Two USB 3.2, One HDMI 2.1; Two TB4	Windows 11 Pro; Linux; Ubuntu Linux
