= LPDDR =

Type of computer memory

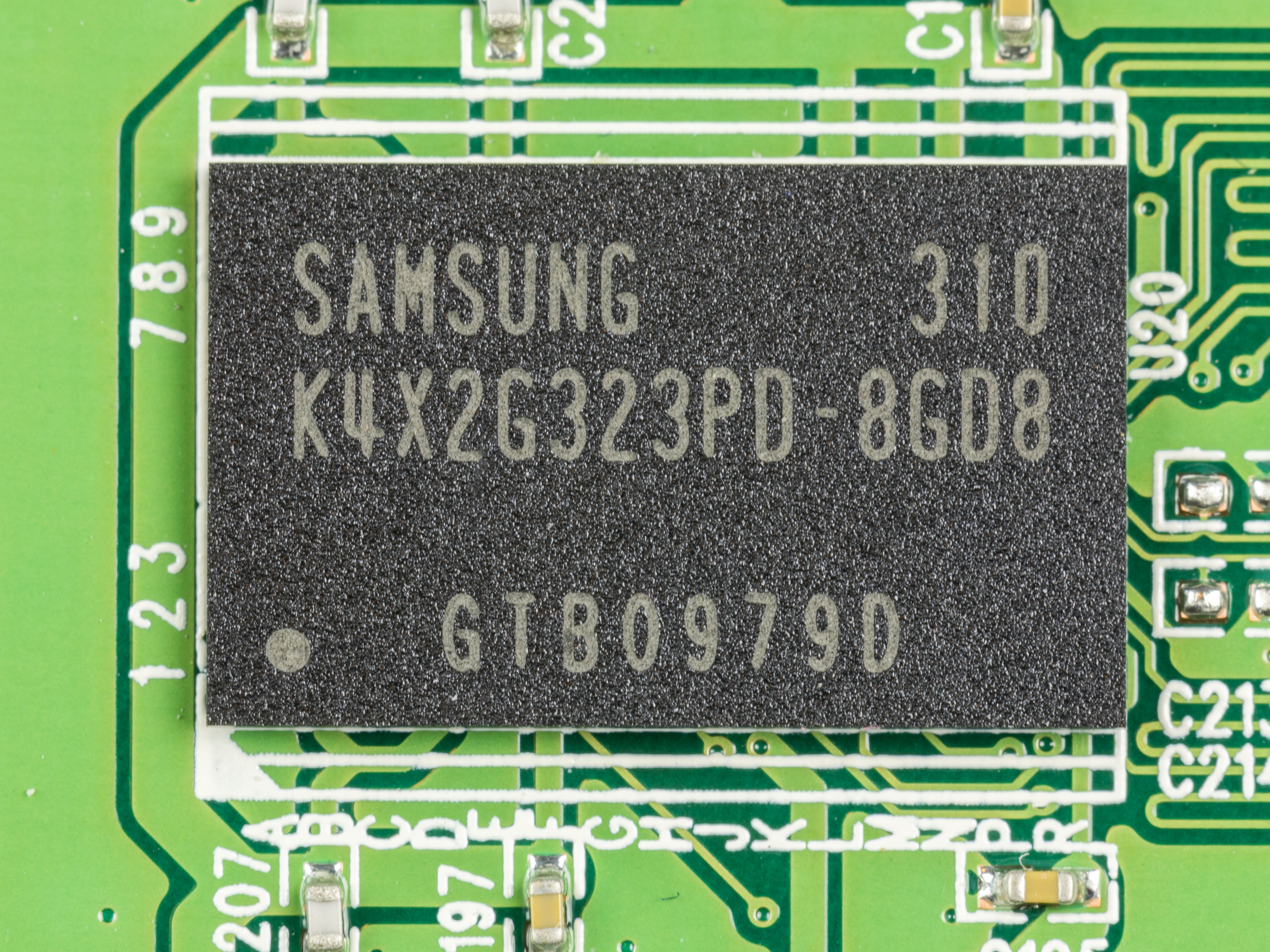
Mobile DDR: Samsung K4X2G323PD-8GD8

Low-Power Double Data Rate (LPDDR) is a type of synchronous dynamic random-access memory (SDRAM) designed to use less power than conventional memory. It is commonly used in smartphones, tablet computers, and laptops, where reducing power consumption is important for battery life. For this reason, earlier versions of the technology were also known as Mobile DDR.

LPDDR differs from standard DDR SDRAM in both design and features, with changes that make it more suitable for mobile devices. Unlike DDR, which is typically installed in removable modules, LPDDR is usually soldered directly onto the device's motherboard to conserve space and improve efficiency. Although LPDDR uses a generational naming convention similar to that of DDR memory (such as LPDDR4 and DDR4), the two follow separate development standards, and the version numbers do not indicate that they share the same technologies. The LPDDR standard is developed and maintained by the JEDEC Solid State Technology Association.

== Bus width ==
In contrast with standard SDRAM, used in stationary devices and laptops and usually connected over a 64-bit wide memory bus, LPDDR also permits 16- or 32-bit wide channels.

The "E" and "X" versions mark enhanced versions of the specifications. They formalize overclocking the memory array by usually 33%.

As with standard SDRAM, most generations double the internal fetch size and external transfer speed, DDR4 and LPDDR5 being the exceptions.

== Generations ==
Comparison of LPDDR SDRAM generations
Gene- ration	Release year	Chip			Bus			Voltage (V)
Gene- ration	Release year	Clock rate (MHz)	Cycle time (ns)	Pre- fetch	Clock rate (MHz)	Transfer rate (MT/s)	Bandwidth (MB/s)	Voltage (V)
1	2006	200		2n	200	400	1 600	1.8
1E	2006	266		2n	266	533	2 132	1.8
2	2009	200		4n	400	800	3 200	1.2; 1.8
2E	2009	266		4n	533	1067	4 268	1.2; 1.8
3	2012	200		8n	800	1600	6 400	1.2; 1.8
3E	2012	266		8n	1067	2133	8 532	1.2; 1.8
4	2014	200		16n	1600	3200	12 800	1.1; 1.8
4X	2017	266		16n	2133	4267	17 068	0.6; 1.1; 1.8
5	2019	400		16n	3200	6400	25 600	0.5; 1.05; 1.8
5X	2021	666		16n	5333	10667	42 668	0.5; 1.05; 1.8
6	2025	900		16n	7200	14400	57 600	0.5; 1.0; 1.8

=== LPDDR(1) ===
The original low-power DDR (sometimes retroactively called LPDDR1), released in 2006 is a slightly modified form of DDR SDRAM, with several changes to reduce overall power consumption.

Most significantly, the supply voltage is reduced from 2.5 to 1.8 V. Additional savings come from temperature-compensated refresh (DRAM requires refresh less often at low temperatures), partial array self refresh, and a "deep power down" mode which sacrifices all memory contents. Additionally, chips are smaller, using less board space than their non-mobile equivalents. Samsung and Micron are two of the main providers of this technology, which is used in tablet and phone devices such as the iPhone 3GS, original iPad, Samsung Galaxy Tab 7.0 and Motorola Droid X.

=== LPDDR2 ===
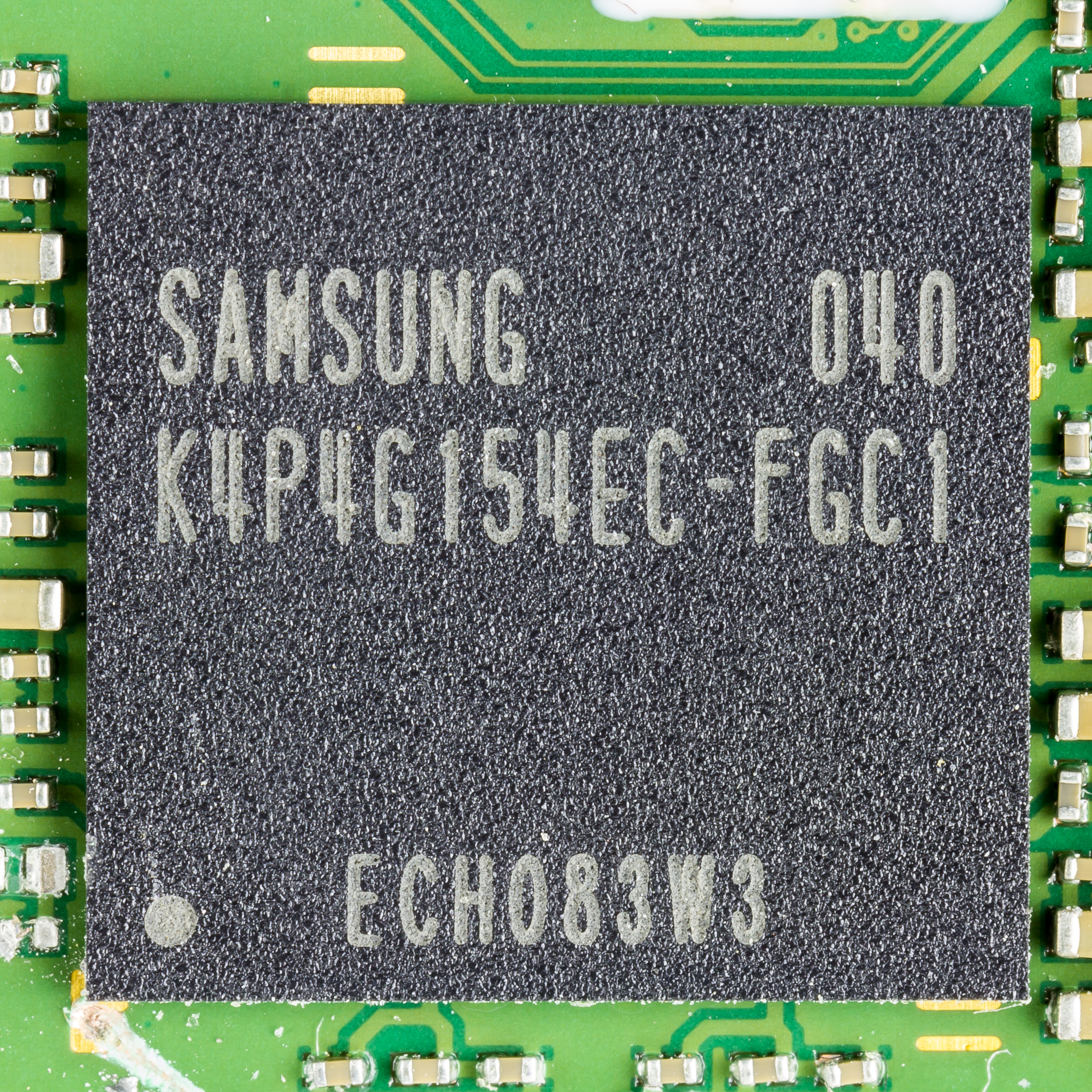
Samsung K4P4G154EC-FGC1 4 Gbit LPDDR2 chip

In 2009, the standards group JEDEC published JESD209-2, which defined a more dramatically revised low-power DDR interface. It is not compatible with either DDR1 or DDR2 SDRAM, but can accommodate any one of:

- LPDDR2-S2: 2n prefetch memory (like DDR1),
- LPDDR2-S4: 4n prefetch memory (like DDR2), or
- LPDDR2-N: Non-volatile (NAND flash) memory.

Low-power states are similar to basic LPDDR, with some additional partial array refresh options.

Timing parameters are specified for LPDDR-200 to LPDDR-1066 (clock frequencies of 100 to 533 MHz).

Working at 1.2 V, LPDDR2 multiplexes the control and address lines onto a 10-bit double data rate CA bus. The commands are similar to those of normal SDRAM, except for the reassignment of the precharge and burst terminate opcodes:

LPDDR2/LPDDR3 command encoding
Operation	↗ Rising clock ↗										↘ Falling clock ↘									
Operation	CA0 (R̅A̅S̅)	CA1 (C̅A̅S̅)	CA2 (W̅E̅)	CA3	CA4	CA5	CA6	CA7	CA8	CA9	CA0 (R̅A̅S̅)	CA1 (C̅A̅S̅)	CA2 (W̅E̅)	CA3	CA4	CA5	CA6	CA7	CA8	CA9
No operation	H	H	H	—																
Precharge all banks	H	H	L	H	H	—														
Precharge one bank	H	H	L	H	L	—		BA0	BA1	BA2	—									
Preactive (LPDDR2-N only)	H	H	L	H	A30	A31	A32	BA0	BA1	BA2	A20	A21	A22	A23	A24	A25	A26	A27	A28	A29
Burst terminate	H	H	L	L	—															
Read (AP=auto-precharge)	H	L	H	reserved		C1	C2	BA0	BA1	BA2	AP	C3	C4	C5	C6	C7	C8	C9	C10	C11
Write (AP=auto-precharge)	H	L	L	reserved		C1	C2	BA0	BA1	BA2	AP	C3	C4	C5	C6	C7	C8	C9	C10	C11
Activate (R0–14=Row address)	L	H	R8	R9	R10	R11	R12	BA0	BA1	BA2	R0	R1	R2	R3	R4	R5	R6	R7	R13	R14
Activate (LPDDR2-N only)	L	H	A15	A16	A17	A18	A19	BA0	BA1	BA2	A5	A6	A7	A8	A9	A10	A11	A12	A13	A14
Refresh all banks (LPDDR2-Sx only)	L	L	H	H	—															
Refresh one bank (round-robin addr.)	L	L	H	L	—															
Mode register read (MA0–7=addr.)	L	L	L	H	MA0	MA1	MA2	MA3	MA4	MA5	MA6	MA7	—							
Mode register write (OP0–7=data)	L	L	L	L	MA0	MA1	MA2	MA3	MA4	MA5	MA6	MA7	OP0	OP1	OP2	OP3	OP4	OP5	OP6	OP7

Column address bit C0 is never transferred, and is assumed to be zero. Burst transfers thus always begin at even addresses.

LPDDR2 also has an active-low chip select (when high, everything is a NOP) and clock enable CKE signal, which operate like SDRAM. Also like SDRAM, the command sent on the cycle that CKE is first dropped selects the power-down state:

- If the chip is active, it freezes in place.
- If the command is a NOP (C̅S̅ low or CA0–2 = HHH), the chip idles.
- If the command is a refresh command (CA0–2 = LLH), the chip enters the self-refresh state.
- If the command is a burst terminate (CA0–2 = HHL), the chip enters the deep power-down state. (A full reset sequence is required when leaving.)

The mode registers have been greatly expanded compared to conventional SDRAM, with an 8-bit address space, and the ability to read them back. Although smaller than a serial presence detect EEPROM, enough information is included to eliminate the need for one.

S2 devices smaller than 4 Gbit, and S4 devices smaller than 1 Gbit have only four banks. They ignore the BA2 signal, and do not support per-bank refresh.

Non-volatile memory devices do not use the refresh commands, and reassign the precharge command to transfer address bits A20 and up. The low-order bits (A19 and down) are transferred by a following Activate command. This transfers the selected row from the memory array to one of 4 or 8 (selected by the BA bits) row data buffers, where they can be read by a Read command. Unlike DRAM, the bank address bits are not part of the memory address; any address can be transferred to any row data buffer. A row data buffer may be from 32 to 4096 bytes long, depending on the type of memory. Rows larger than 32 bytes ignore some of the low-order address bits in the Activate command. Rows smaller than 4096 bytes ignore some of the high-order address bits in the Read command.

Non-volatile memory does not support the Write command to row data buffers. Rather, a series of control registers in a special address region support Read and Write commands, which can be used to erase and program the memory array.

=== LPDDR3 ===
In May 2012, JEDEC published the JESD209-3 Low Power Memory Device Standard. In comparison to LPDDR2, LPDDR3 offers a higher data rate, greater bandwidth and power efficiency, and higher memory density. LPDDR3 achieves a data rate of 1600 MT/s and utilizes key new technologies: write-leveling and command/address training, optional on-die termination (ODT), and low-I/O capacitance. LPDDR3 supports both package-on-package (PoP) and discrete packaging types.

The command encoding is identical to LPDDR2, using a 10-bit double data rate CA bus. However, the standard only specifies 8n-prefetch DRAM, and does not include the flash memory commands.

Products using LPDDR3 include the 2013 MacBook Air, iPhone 5S, iPhone 6, Nexus 10, Samsung Galaxy S4 (GT-I9500) and Microsoft Surface Pro 3 and 4. LPDDR3 went mainstream in 2013, running at 800 MHz DDR (1600 MT/s), offering bandwidth comparable to PC3-12800 notebook memory in 2011 (12.8 GB/s of bandwidth). To achieve this bandwidth, the controller must implement dual-channel memory. For example, this is the case for the Exynos 5 Dual and the 5 Octa.

==== LPDDR3E ====
An "enhanced" version of the specification called LPDDR3E increases the data rate to 2133 MT/s. Samsung Electronics introduced the first 4 gigabit 20 nm-class LPDDR3 modules capable of transmitting data at up to 2,133 MT/s, more than double the performance of the older LPDDR2 which is only capable of 800 MT/s. Various SoCs from various manufacturers also natively support 800 MHz LPDDR3 RAM. Such include the Snapdragon 600 and 800 from Qualcomm as well as some SoCs from the Exynos and Allwinner series.

=== LPDDR4 ===
On 14 March 2012, JEDEC hosted a conference to explore how future mobile device requirements will drive upcoming standards like LPDDR4. On 30 December 2013, Samsung announced that it had developed the first 20 nm-class 8 gigabit (1 GB) LPDDR4 capable of transmitting data at 3,200 MT/s, thus providing 50 percent higher performance than the fastest LPDDR3 and consuming around 40 percent less energy at 1.1 volts.

On 25 August 2014, JEDEC published the JESD209-4 LPDDR4 Low Power Memory Device Standard.

Significant changes include:

- Doubling of the interface speed, and numerous consequent electrical changes, including changing the I/O standard to low-voltage swing-terminated logic (LVSTL)
- Doubling of the internal prefetch size, and minimum transfer size
- Change from a 10-bit DDR command/address bus to a 6-bit SDR bus
- Change from one 32-bit wide bus to two independent 16-bit wide buses
- Self-refresh is enabled by dedicated commands, rather than being controlled by the CKE line

The standard defines SDRAM packages containing two independent 16-bit access channels, each connected to up to two dies per package. Each channel is 16 data bits wide, has its own control/address pins, and allows access to 8 banks of DRAM. Thus, the package may be connected in three ways:

- Data lines and control connected in parallel to a 16-bit data bus, and only chip selects connected independently per channel.
- To two halves of a 32-bit wide data bus, and the control lines in parallel, including chip select.
- To two independent 16-bit wide data buses

Each die provides 4, 6, 8, 12, or 16 gigabits of memory, half to each channel. Thus, each bank is one sixteenth the device size. This is organized into the appropriate number (16 K to 64 K) of 16384-bit (2048-byte) rows. Extension to 24 and 32 gigabits is planned, but it is not yet decided if this will be done by increasing the number of rows, their width, or the number of banks.

Larger packages providing double width (four channels) and up to four dies per pair of channels (8 dies total per package) are also defined.

Data is accessed in bursts of either 16 or 32 transfers (256 or 512 bits, 32 or 64 bytes, 8 or 16 cycles DDR). Bursts must begin on 64-bit boundaries.

Since the clock frequency is higher and the minimum burst length longer than earlier standards, control signals can be more highly multiplexed without the command/address bus becoming a bottleneck. LPDDR4 multiplexes the control and address lines onto a 6-bit single data rate CA bus. Commands require 2 clock cycles, and operations encoding an address (e.g., activate row, read or write column) require two commands. For example, to request a read from an idle chip requires four commands taking 8 clock cycles: Activate-1, Activate-2, Read, CAS-2.

The chip select line (CS) is active-high. The first cycle of a command is identified by chip select being high; it is low during the second cycle.

LPDDR4 command encoding
First cycle (CS high)						Second cycle (CS low)						Operation
CA5	CA4	CA3	CA2	CA1	CA0	CA5	CA4	CA3	CA2	CA1	CA0	Operation
L	L	L	L	L	L	—						No operation
H	L	L	L	L	L	0	OP4	OP3	OP2	OP1	1	Multi-purpose command
AB	H	L	L	L	L	—			BA2	BA1	BA0	Precharge (AB: all banks)
AB	L	H	L	L	L	—			BA2	BA1	BA0	Refresh (AB: all banks)
—	H	H	L	L	L	—						Self-refresh entry
BL	L	L	H	L	L	AP	C9	—	BA2	BA1	BA0	Write-1 (+CAS-2)
—	H	L	H	L	L	—						Self-refresh exit
0	L	H	H	L	L	AP	C9	—	BA2	BA1	BA0	Masked write-1 (+CAS-2)
—	H	H	H	L	L	—						Reserved
BL	L	L	L	H	L	AP	C9	—	BA2	BA1	BA0	Read-1 (+CAS-2)
C8	H	L	L	H	L	C7	C6	C5	C4	C3	C2	CAS-2
—		H	L	H	L	—						Reserved
OP7	L	L	H	H	L	MA5	MA4	MA3	MA2	MA1	MA0	Mode register write-1 and -2; MA: address, OP: data
OP6	H	L	H	H	L	OP5	OP4	OP3	OP2	OP1	OP0	Mode register write-1 and -2; MA: address, OP: data
—	L	H	H	H	L	MA5	MA4	MA3	MA2	MA1	MA0	Mode register read (+CAS-2)
—	H	H	H	H	L	—						Reserved
R15	R14	R13	R12	L	H	R11	R10	R16	BA2	BA1	BA0	Activate-1 and -2
R9	R8	R7	R6	H	H	R5	R4	R3	R2	R1	R0	Activate-1 and -2

The CAS-2 command is used as the second half of all commands that perform a transfer across the data bus, and provides low-order column address bits:

- Read commands must begin on a column address which is a multiple of 4; there is no provision for communicating a non-zero C0 or C1 address bit to the memory.
- Write commands must begin on a column address which is a multiple of 16; C2 and C3 must be zero for a write command.
- Mode register read and some multi-purpose commands must also be followed by a CAS-2 command, however all the column bits must be zero (low).

The burst length can be configured to be 16, 32, or dynamically selectable by the BL bit of read and write operations.

One DMI (data mask/invert) signal is associated with each 8 data lines, and can be used to minimize the number of bits driven high during data transfers. When high, the other 8 bits are complemented by both transmitter and receiver. If a byte contains five or more 1 bits, the DMI signal can be driven high, along with three or fewer data lines. As signal lines are terminated low, this reduces power consumption.

(An alternative usage, where DMI is used to limit the number of data lines which toggle on each transfer to at most 4, minimises crosstalk. This may be used by the memory controller during writes, but is not supported by the memory devices.)

Data bus inversion can be separately enabled for reads and writes. For masked writes (which have a separate command code), the operation of the DMI signal depends on whether write inversion is enabled.

- If DBI on writes is disabled, a high level on DMI indicates that the corresponding data byte is to be ignored and not written
- If DBI on writes is enabled, a low level on DMI, combined with a data byte with 5 or more bits set, indicates a data byte to be ignored and not written.

LPDDR4 also includes a mechanism for "targeted row refresh" to avoid corruption due to "row hammer" on adjacent rows. A special sequence of three activate/precharge sequences specifies the row which was activated more often than a device-specified threshold (200,000 to 700,000 per refresh cycle). Internally, the device refreshes physically adjacent rows rather than the one specified in the activate command.

==== LPDDR4X ====
Samsung Semiconductor proposed an "extended" version of the LPDDR4 specification that it called LPDDR4X. LPDDR4X is identical to LPDDR4 except additional power is saved by reducing the I/O voltage (Vddq) from 1.1 V to 0.6 V. On 9 January 2017, SK Hynix announced 8 and 16 GB LPDDR4X packages. JEDEC published the LPDDR4X standard on 8 March 2017. Aside from the lower voltage, additional improvements include a single-channel die option for smaller applications, new MCP, PoP and IoT packages, and additional definition and timing improvements for the highest 4266 MT/s speed grade.

=== LPDDR5 ===
On 19 February 2019, JEDEC published the JESD209-5, Standard for Low Power Double Data Rate 5 (LPDDR5).

Samsung announced it had working prototype LPDDR5 chips in July 2018. LPDDR5 introduces the following changes:

- Data transfer rate is increased to 6400 Mbit/s per pin
- Differential clocks are used (3200 MHz, DDR)
- Prefetch is not doubled again, but remains 16n
- The number of banks is increased to 16, divided into four DDR4-like bank groups
- Power-saving improvements:
  - Data-Copy and Write-X (all one or all zero) commands to decrease data transfer
  - Dynamic frequency and voltage scaling
- A new clocking architecture, where commands use a quarter-speed master clock (CK), while data is transferred using full-speed Write Clock (WCK) & Read Strobe (RDQS) signals which are enabled only when necessary
- One set of full-speed clocks per byte (vs. per 16 bits in LPDDR4)
- Elimination of the Clock Enable (CKE) pin; instead low-power mode is entered by a command over the CA bus, and lasts until the chip select signal next goes high

AMD Van Gogh, Intel Tiger Lake, Apple silicon (A16, A17 Pro, M1, M2 and M3), Huawei Kirin 9000 and Snapdragon 888 support LPDDR5.

The doubling of the transfer rate, and the quarter-speed master clock, results in a master clock which is half the frequency of a similar LPDDR4 clock. The command (CA) bus is widened to 7 bits, and commands are transferred at double data rate, so commands end up being sent at the same rate as LPDDR4.

LPDDR5 command encoding
↗ Rising clock ↗							↘ Falling clock ↘							Operation
CA6	CA5	CA4	CA3	CA2	CA1	CA0	CA6	CA5	CA4	CA3	CA2	CA1	CA0	Operation
L	L	L	L	L	L	L	—							No operation
H	L	L	L	L	L	L	—							Power-down entry
L	H	L	L	L	L	L	— L —							Read FIFO
H	H	L	L	L	L	L	— L —							Write FIFO
L	L	H	L	L	L	L	—							Reserved
H	L	H	L	L	L	L	— L —							Read DQ Calibration
OP7	H	H	L	L	L	L	OP6	OP5	OP4	OP3	OP2	OP1	OP0	Multi-purpose command
OP7	L	L	H	L	L	L	OP6	OP5	OP4	OP3	OP2	OP1	OP0	Mode register write 2
L	H	L	H	L	L	L	—							Self-refresh exit
H	H	L	H	L	L	L	PD	DSE	—					Self-refresh entry
L	L	H	H	L	L	L	MA6	MA5	MA4	MA3	MA2	MA1	MA0	Mode register read
H	L	H	H	L	L	L	MA6	MA5	MA4	MA3	MA2	MA1	MA0	Mode register write 1
L	H	H	H	L	L	L	AB	SB1	SB0	RFM	BG0	BA1	BA0	Refresh
H	H	H	H	L	L	L	AB	—		BG1	BG0	BA1	BA0	Precharge
C5	C4	C3	L	H	L	L	AP	C2	C1	BG1	BG0	BA1	BA0	Write 32
WS_; FS	WS_; RD	WS_; WR	H	H	L	L	WXSB /B3	WXSA	WRX	DC3	DC2	DC1	DC0	Column address select
C5	C4	C3	C0	L	H	L	AP	C2	C1	BG1	BG0	BA1	BA0	Masked Write
C5	C4	C3	C0	H	H	L	AP	C2	C1	BG1	BG0	BA1	BA0	Write
C5	C4	C3	C0	L	L	H	AP	C2	C1	BG1	BG0	BA1	BA0	Read
C5	C4	C3	C0	H	L	H	AP	C2	C1	BG1	BG0	BA1	BA0	Read 32
R10	R9	R8	R7	L	H	H	R6	R5	R4	R3	R2	R1	R0	Activate 2
R17	R16	R15	R14	H	H	H	R13	R12	R11	BG1	BG0	BA1	BA0	Activate 1

- Bn = Burst address bit
- Cn = Column address bit
- Rn = Row address bit
- BAn = Bank address bit
- BGn = Bank group address bit
- AB = All banks (ignore BG & BA)
- AP = Auto-precharge
- MAn = Mode register address bit
- OPn = Operation, or mode register data
- WS_xx = WCK synchronization
- WRX = Write X; do not transfer data, but fill with all-zero or all-one
- WXSA, WXSB = Write X select, value to be written
- PD = Power down
- DSE = Deep sleep enable

Compared to earlier standards, the nomenclature for column addresses has changed. Both LPDDR4 and LPDDR5 allow up to 10 bits of column address, but the names are different. LPDDR4's C0–C9 are renamed B0–B3 and C0–C5. As with LPDDR4, writes must start at a multiple-of-16 address with B0–B3 zero, but reads may request a burst be transferred in a different order by specifying a non-zero value for B3.

As with LPDDR4, to read some data requires 4 commands: two activate commands to select a row, then a CAS and a read command to select a column. Unlike LPDDR4, the CAS command comes before the read or write command. In fact, it is something of a misnomer, in that it does not select a column at all. Instead, its primary function is to prepare the DRAM to synchronize with the imminent start of the high-speed WCK clock. The WS_FS, WS_RD and WS_WR bits select various timings, with the _RD and _WR options optimized for an immediately following read or write command, while the _FS option starts the clock immediately, and may be followed by multiple reads or writes, accessing multiple banks.

CAS also specifies the "write X" option. If the WRX bit is set, writes do not transfer data, but rather fill the burst with all-zeros or all-ones, under the control of the WXS (write-X select) bit. This takes the same amount of time, but saves energy.

In addition to the usual bursts of 16, there are commands for performing double-length bursts of 32. Reads (but not writes) may specify a starting position within the 32-word aligned burst using the C0 and B3 bits.

==== LPDDR5X ====
On 28 July 2021, JEDEC published an "extended" version of the LPDDR5 standard called LPDDR5X with the following changes:

- Speed extension up to 8533 Mbit/s
- Signal integrity improvements with tx/rx equalization
- Reliability improvements via the new Adaptive Refresh Management feature

On 9 November 2021, Samsung announced that the company had developed the industry's first LPDDR5X DRAM. Samsung's implementation involves 16-gigabit (2 GB) dies, on a 14 nm process node, with modules with up to 32 dies (64 GB) in a single package. According to the company, the new modules would use 20% less power than LPDDR5. According to Andrei Frumusanu of AnandTech, LPDDR5X in SoCs and other products was expected for the 2023 generation of devices.

On 19 November 2021, Micron announced that Mediatek has validated its LPDDR5X DRAM for Mediatek's Dimensity 9000 5G SoC.

On 25 January 2023 SK Hynix announced "Low Power Double Data Rate 5 Turbo" (LPDDR5T) chips with a bandwidth of 9.6 Gbit/s. It operates in the ultra-low voltage range of 1.01–1.12 V set by JEDEC. It has been incorporated into the LPDDR5X standard as LPDDR5X-9600 making "LPDDR5T" a brand name. MediaTek Dimensity 9300 and Qualcomm Snapdragon 8 Gen 3 support LPDDR5T.

On 17 April 2024 Samsung Electronics announced LPDDR5X-10700 with 25% higher bandwidth, 30% higher capacity and 25% improved power efficiency than previous LPDDR5X generations. This is achieved through a new 12 nm process that allows the chips to be more efficient while also being small enough to fit capacities of up to 32 GB in a single package.

On 16 July 2024 Samsung has completed validation of the industry's fastest LPDDR5X DRAM, capable of operating at speeds up to 10.7 Gbit/s, for use in MediaTek's upcoming flagship Dimensity 9400 SoC.

=== LPDDR6 ===
On 9 July 2025, JEDEC published the JESD209-6, standard for Low Power Double Data Rate 6 (LPDDR6) with the following changes:

- Speed extension to 10.6–14.4 Gbit/s/pin
- CA bus further narrowed to 4 bits
- Data bus width of 12 bits per channel
- Bursts of 24 transfers × 12 pins = 288 bits:
  - 256 data bits, plus
  - 16 tag/ECC bits stored by array, plus
  - 16 bits for data bus inversion or link ECC, not stored.
- CAMM2
