= Memory module =

Printed circuit board for computer memory

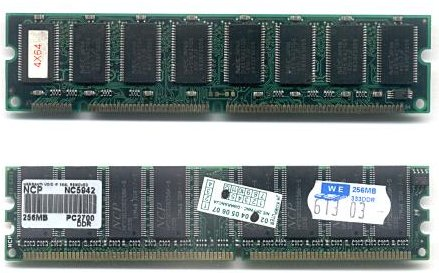
Two types of DIMMs (dual in-line memory modules): a 168-pin SDRAM module (top) and a 184-pin DDR SDRAM module (bottom).

In computing, a memory module or RAM stick is a printed circuit board on which memory integrated circuits are mounted.

Memory modules permit easy installation and replacement in electronic systems, especially computers such as personal computers, workstations, and servers. The first memory modules were proprietary designs that were specific to a model of computer from a specific manufacturer. Later, memory modules were standardized by organizations such as JEDEC and could be used in any system designed to use them.

Distinguishing characteristics of computer memory modules include voltage, capacity, speed (i.e., bit rate), and form factor.

== Overview ==
Types of memory module include:

- TransFlash Memory Module
- SIMM, a single in-line memory module
- DIMM, dual in-line memory module
  - Rambus memory modules are a subset of DIMMs, but are normally referred to as RIMMs
  - SO-DIMM, small outline DIMM, a smaller version of the DIMM, used in laptops
- Compression Attached Memory Module, thinner than SO-DIMM

The large memories found in personal computers, workstations, and non-handheld game-consoles normally consist of dynamic RAM (DRAM). Other parts of the computer, such as cache memories normally use static RAM. Small amounts of SRAM are sometimes used in the same package as DRAM. However, since SRAM has high leakage power and low density, die-stacked DRAM has recently been used for designing multi-megabyte sized processor caches.

Physically, most DRAM is packaged in black epoxy resin.

== General DRAM formats ==
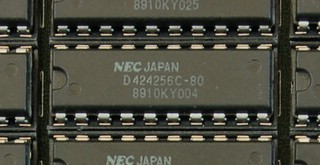
A 256 x 4 Kibit 20-pin DIP DRAM on an early PC memory card, usually Industry Standard Architecture

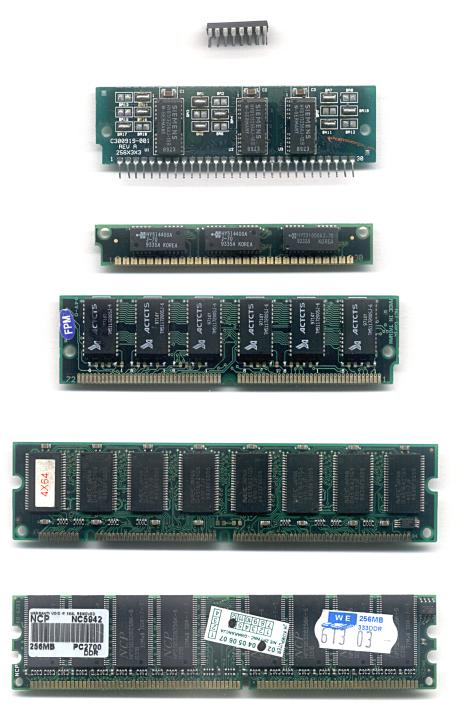
Common DRAM packages. From top to bottom: DIP, SIPP, SIMM (30‑pin), SIMM (72‑pin), DIMM (168‑pin), DDR DIMM (184‑pin).

16 GiB DDR4-2666 288-pin 1.2 V UDIMMs

Dynamic random access memory is produced as integrated circuits (ICs) bonded and mounted into plastic packages with metal pins for connection to control signals and buses. In early use individual DRAM ICs were usually either installed directly to the motherboard or on ISA expansion cards; later they were assembled into multi-chip plug-in modules (DIMMs, SIMMs, etc.). Some standard module types are:

- DRAM chip (Integrated Circuit or IC)
  - Dual in-line Package (DIP/DIL)
  - Zig-zag in-line package (ZIP)
- DRAM (memory) modules
  - Single In-line Pin Package (SIPP)
  - Single In-line Memory Module (SIMM)
  - Dual In-line Memory Module (DIMM)
  - Rambus In-line Memory Module (RIMM), technically DIMMs but called RIMMs due to their proprietary slot.
  - Small outline DIMM (SO-DIMM), about half the size of regular DIMMs, are mostly used in notebooks, small footprint PCs (such as Mini-ITX motherboards), upgradable office printers and networking hardware like routers.
  - Small outline RIMM (SO-RIMM). Smaller version of the RIMM, used in laptops. Technically SO-DIMMs but called SO-RIMMs due to their proprietary slot.
  - Compression Attached Memory Module (CAMM), a standard developed by Dell, which uses a land grid array instead of the more common edge connector.
- Stacked vis-à-vis non-stacked RAM modules
  - Stacked RAM modules contain two or more RAM chips stacked on top of each other. This allows large modules to be manufactured using cheaper low density wafers. Stacked chip modules draw more power, and tend to run hotter than non-stacked modules. Stacked modules can be packaged using the older TSOP or the newer BGA style IC chips. Silicon dies connected with older wire bonding or newer TSV.
  - Several proposed stacked RAM approaches exist, with TSV and much wider interfaces, including Wide I/O, Wide I/O 2, Hybrid Memory Cube and High Bandwidth Memory.

== Common DRAM modules ==
Common DRAM packages as illustrated to the right, from top to bottom (last three types are not present in the group picture, and the last type is available in a separate picture), this list is in roughly chronological order:

- DIP 16-pin (DRAM chip, usually pre-fast page mode DRAM (FPRAM))
- SIPP 30-pin (usually FPRAM)
- SIMM 30-pin (usually FPRAM)
- SIMM 72-pin (often extended data out DRAM (EDO DRAM) but FPRAM is not uncommon)
- DIMM 168-pin (most SDRAM but some were extended data out DRAM (EDO DRAM))
- DIMM 184-pin (DDR SDRAM)
- RIMM 184-pin (RDRAM)
- DIMM 240-pin (DDR2 SDRAM and DDR3 SDRAM)
- DIMM 288-pin (DDR4 SDRAM and DDR5 SDRAM)

Common SO-DIMM DRAM modules:

- 72-pin (32-bit)
- 144-pin (64-bit) used for SO-DIMM SDRAM
- 200-pin (72-bit) used for SO-DIMM DDR SDRAM and SO-DIMM DDR2 SDRAM
- 204-pin (64-bit) used for SO-DIMM DDR3 SDRAM
- 260-pin used for SO-DIMM DDR4 SDRAM
- 262-pin used for SO-DIMM DDR5 SDRAM

JEDEC defines a concise code printed onto memory module labels for describing their speed, size, and technological compatibility. See JEDEC memory standards § Product label.

== See also ==
- List of RAM modules manufacturers
- Random-access memory (RAM)
