= High Efficiency Video Coding implementations and products =

High Efficiency Video Coding implementations and products covers the implementations and products of High Efficiency Video Coding (HEVC).

== History ==
=== 2012 ===
On February 29, 2012, at the 2012 Mobile World Congress, Qualcomm demonstrated a HEVC decoder running on an Android tablet, with a Qualcomm Snapdragon S4 dual-core processor running at 1.5 GHz, showing H.264/MPEG-4 AVC and HEVC versions of the same video content playing side by side. In this demonstration HEVC reportedly showed almost a 50% bit rate reduction compared with H.264/MPEG-4 AVC.

On August 22, 2012, Ericsson announced that the world's first HEVC encoder, the Ericsson SVP 5500, would be shown at the upcoming International Broadcasting Convention (IBC) 2012 trade show. The Ericsson SVP 5500 HEVC encoder is designed for real-time encoding of video for delivery to mobile devices. On the same day, it was announced that researchers are planning to extend MPEG-DASH to support HEVC by April 2013.

On September 2, 2012, Vanguard Video, formerly Vanguard Software Solutions (VSS), announced a real-time HEVC software encoder running at 1080p30 (1920x1080, 30fps) on a single Intel Xeon processor. This encoder was demonstrated at IBC 2012.

On September 6, 2012, Rovi Corporation announced that a MainConcept SDK for HEVC would be released in early 2013 shortly after HEVC is officially ratified. The HEVC MainConcept SDK includes a decoder, encoder, and transport multiplexer for Microsoft Windows, macOS, Linux, iOS, and Android. The HEVC MainConcept SDK encoder was demonstrated at the IBC 2012 trade show.

On September 9, 2012, ATEME demonstrated at the IBC 2012 trade show a HEVC encoder that encoded video with a resolution of 3840x2160p at 60 fps with an average bit rate of 15 Mbit/s. ATEME is planning to release their HEVC encoder in October 2013.

=== 2013 ===
On January 7, 2013, ViXS Systems announced that they would show the first hardware SoC capable of transcoding video to the Main 10 profile of HEVC at the 2013 International CES. On the same day Rovi Corporation announced that after the HEVC standard is released that they plan to start adding support for HEVC to their MainConcept SDK and to their DivX products.

On January 8, 2013, Broadcom announced the BCM7445 which is an Ultra HD decoding chip capable of decoding HEVC at up to 4096x2160p at 60 fps. The BCM7445 is a 28 nm ARM architecture chip capable of 21,000 Dhrystone MIPS with volume production estimated for the middle of 2014.

On January 8, 2013, Vanguard Video announced the availability of V.265, a professional pure-software HEVC encoder capable of real-time performance.

On January 25, 2013, NGCodec announced the availability of free H.265/HEVC compliance test clips.

On February 4, 2013, NTT DoCoMo announced that starting in March it would begin licensing its implementation of HEVC decoding software. The decoding software can allow playback of 4K UHDTV at 60 fps on personal computers and 1080p on smartphones and was planned to demonstrated at the 2013 Mobile World Congress. In a JCT-VC document NTT DoCoMo showed that their HEVC software decoder could decode 3840x2160 at 60 fps using 3 decoding threads on a 2.7 GHz quad core Ivy Bridge CPU.

On February 11, 2013, researchers from MIT demonstrated the world's first published HEVC ASIC decoder at the International Solid-State Circuits Conference (ISSCC) 2013. Their chip was capable of decoding a 3840x2160p at 30 fps video stream in real time, consuming under 0.1W of power.

On March 14, 2013, Ittiam Systems Announces Availability and Software Licensing of HEVC (H.265) Video Encoder and Decoder for Professional, Enterprise and Consumer Digital Media Markets. The HEVC Encoder is a software implementation on Intel x86 based platforms, capable of High Definition (HD) broadcast quality video encoding. The Decoder software available on ARM CortexTM-A9 and CortexTM-A15 based SoCs allows a wide range of existing Consumer Electronics (CE) devices such as Smartphones, Tablets, Smart TVs and Set-Top Boxes to play back High Definition (HD) HEVC content. Ittiam's HEVC solutions were showcased at CES 2013, MWC 2013 and NAB2013

On April 3, 2013, ATEME announced the availability of the first open source implementation of a HEVC software player based on the OpenHEVC decoder and GPAC video player which are both licensed under LGPL. The OpenHEVC decoder supports the Main profile of HEVC and can decode 1080p at 30 fps video using a single core CPU. A live transcoder that supports HEVC and used in combination with the GPAC video player was shown at the ATEME booth at the NAB Show in April 2013.

On April 19, 2013, SES announced the first Ultra HD transmission using the HEVC standard. The transmission had a resolution of 3840x2160 and a bit rate of 20 Mbit/s. SES used Harmonic's ProMedia Xpress HEVC encoder and Broadcom's BCM7445 HEVC decoder.

On May 9, 2013, NHK and Mitsubishi Electric announced that they had jointly developed the first HEVC encoder for 8K Ultra HD TV, which is also called Super Hi-Vision (SHV). The HEVC encoder supports the Main 10 profile at Level 6.1 allowing it to encode 10-bit video with a resolution of 7680x4320 at 60 fps. The HEVC encoder has 17 3G-SDI inputs and uses 17 boards for parallel processing with each board encoding a row of 7680x256 pixels to allow for real time video encoding. The HEVC encoder is compliant with draft 4 of the HEVC standard and has a maximum bit rate of 340 Mbit/s. The HEVC encoder was shown at the NHK Science & Technology Research Laboratories Open House 2013 that took place from May 30 to June 2. At the NHK Open House 2013 the HEVC encoder used a bit rate of 85 Mbit/s which gives a compression ratio of 350:1.

On May 15, 2013, DivX released a draft version of DivX HEVC video profiles that are based on the Main profile and Main tier of HEVC with additional restrictions specific to the DivX HEVC video profiles. The draft version of DivX HEVC 4K, 1080p, and 720p video profiles currently define only the video and DivX is planning to define other elements of the profiles in the future. The DivX HEVC 4K video profile allows for a maximum bit rate of HEVC Level 5.1 (40 Mbit/s) but the maximum number of samples per second is limited to HEVC Level 5 (4096x2160 at 30 fps).

On May 31, 2013, Orange announced the first public HEVC demonstration of a real time end-to-end delivery chain. The HEVC demonstration included a high definition broadcast of the 2013 French Open from June 1 to June 9 that uses both IPTV and DVB-T2.

On June 4, 2013, Rovi Corporation released the MainConcept HEVC SDK 1.0. SDK 1.0 supports Smart Adaptive Bitrate Encoding Technology (SABET) which allows for the simultaneous encoding of up to 10 video output streams with reduced computing cost. SDK 1.0 is available for Windows and SDK 1.0.1, which will be released in July 2013, will add support for Linux and macOS. SDK 1.0 supports the Main profile while SDK 2.0, which will be released in Q4 2013, will add support for the Main 10 profile.

On June 10, 2013, Vanguard Video announced that support for the Main 10 profile was added to their V.265 professional HEVC encoder. V.265 is the first real time HEVC software encoder to support the Main 10 profile.

On June 20, 2013, Imagination Technologies announced their PowerVR Series5 HEVC decoder. The PowerVR D5500 decoder core supports 10-bits per sample video decoding.

On July 19, 2013, Allegro DVT announced that they had improved their HEVC decoder IP by adding support for the Main 10 profile.

On July 23, 2013, VITEC announced the Stradis HDM850+ Professional Decoder Card. HDM850+ is the first PCIe based card supporting real time HEVC decoding (as well as H.264 and MPEG-2). HDM850+ decodes and display HEVC / H.265 clips or stream over 3G-SDI/HDMI video outputs. It supports HEVC/H.265 decode up to 1080p60 4:2:2 10bits (Main10 profile at Level 4.1 High Tier).

On July 23, 2013, MulticoreWare released alpha source code for x265, a video encoder application and library for encoding video into an HEVC bitstream. x265 is an open source software available under GNU GPL v2 license.

On August 8, 2013, Nippon Telegraph and Telephone announced the release of their HEVC-1000 SDK software encoder which supports the Main 10 profile, resolutions up to 7680x4320, and frame rates up to 120 fps.

On August 21, 2013, Microsoft released a DirectX Video Acceleration (DXVA) specification for HEVC which supports the Main profile, the Main 10 profile, and the Main Still Picture profile. DXVA 2.0 is required for HEVC decoding to be hardware accelerated and compatible decoders can use DXVA 2.0 for the following operations: bitstream parsing, deblocking, inverse quantization scaling, inverse transform processing, and motion compensation.

On September 4, 2013, Ittiam Systems demonstrated Real-Time 1080p HEVC Encoding and 4K HEVC Decoding at IBC’13. Ittiam's software HEVC encoder on Intel x86 platforms supports UHD resolutions and is capable of real-time broadcast grade encoding of HD 1080p content. The software decoders on Intel and ARM CortexTM are capable of performing 4K/UHD real time decoding.

On September 11, 2013, ViXS Systems announced the XCode 6400 SoC which supports 4K resolution at 60 fps, the Main 10 profile of HEVC, and the Rec. 2020 color space.

On September 6, 2013, Thomson Video Networks demonstrated a trial of the HEVC codec for ultra HD transmission, conducted by satellite transmission operator HISPASAT.

On September 11, 2013, NGCodec Inc. announced availability of free 4K HEVC/H.265 test clips.

At the September 12–17, 2013 IBC show in Amsterdam, HEVC was a significant theme – with HEVC technology products being demonstrated by several companies, including Advantech, Allegro DVT, Ateme, Broadcom, Elemental Technologies, Envivio, Ericsson, Fraunhofer HHI, Fujitsu, Haivision, Harmonic, Ittiam, Kontron, Media Excel, NGCodec Inc., NTT-AT, NXP Software, Pace, QuickFire Networks Rovi/Mainconcept, SES, Squid Systems, STMicroelectronics, Tata Elxsi, Technicolor, Telestream, Thomson Video Networks, Vanguard Video, VITEC and VisualOn.

On October 16, 2013, the OpenHEVC decoder was added to FFmpeg.

On October 23, 2013, Ittiam demonstrated its low power HEVC decoder optimized for ARM Mali™ GPU Compute and ARM® Cortex®-A processor at ARM TechCon 2013. Ittiam's HEVC decoder has been designed to take advantage of the full capabilities of mobile SoCs, it harnesses the great computational power and energy efficiency of GPUs to reduce the battery drain.

On October 29, 2013, Elemental Technologies announced support for real-time 4K HEVC video processing. Elemental provided live video streaming of the 2013 Osaka Marathon on October 27, 2013, in a workflow designed by K-Opticom, a telecommunications operator in Japan. Live coverage of the race in 4K HEVC was available to viewers at the International Exhibition Center in Osaka. This transmission of 4K HEVC video in real-time was an industry-first.

On November 14, 2013, DivX developers released information on HEVC decoding performance using an Intel i7 CPU at 3.5 GHz which had 4 cores and 8 threads. The DivX 10.1 Beta decoder was capable of 210.9 fps at 720p, 101.5 fps at 1080p, and 29.6 fps at 4K.

On December 18, 2013, ViXS Systems announced shipments of their XCode 6400 SoC which is the first SoC to support the Main 10 profile of HEVC.

=== 2014 ===
On January 15, 2014, oViCs announced the ViC-1 HEVC decoder which supports the Main 10 profile at up to 4K at 120 fps.

On February 13, 2014, PathPartner Technology Pvt.Ltd announced HEVC Decoder on ARM Cortex-A Family Processors which takes advantage of the full capabilities of mobile SoCs built on latest ARM processors.

On April 7, 2014, Vantrix released source code for the f265 HEVC encoder under the BSD license.

On August 5, 2014, Squid Systems announced the Squid Systems Video Codec Hardware IP Available for Licensing.

On August 13, 2014, Ittiam Systems announces availability of its third generation H.265/HEVC codec with 422 12-bit support.

On August 19, 2014, Nippon Telegraph and Telephone announced that support for the HEVC range extensions was added to their HEVC-1000 SDK software encoder which can encode video using the Main 4:2:2 12 profile.

On September 5, 2014, the Blu-ray Disc Association announced that the 4K Blu-ray Disc (as known as Ultra HD Blu-ray) specification will support 4K video at 60 fps, High Efficiency Video Coding, the Rec. 2020 color space, high dynamic range, and 10-bit color depth. 4K Blu-ray Disc will have a data rate of at least 50 Mbit/s and may include support for 66/100 GB discs. 4K Blu-ray Disc will be licensed in the spring or summer of 2015 and 4K Blu-ray Disc players have an expected release date of late 2015.

On September 9, 2014, Apple announced the iPhone 6 and iPhone 6 Plus which supports H.265 for FaceTime over cellular.

In October 2014, Nvidia included 4K HEVC hardware encode support on its GeForce GTX 980 video card.

On October 22, 2014, Ambarella announced their S3 SoC that encodes HEVC video at 4K resolution.

On October 31, 2014, Microsoft confirmed that Windows 10 will support HEVC out of the box, according to a statement from Gabriel Aul, the leader of Microsoft Operating Systems Group's Data and Fundamentals Team. Windows 10 Technical Preview Build 9860 added platform level support for HEVC and Matroska.

On November 7, 2014, DivX developers announced that DivX265 version 1.4.21 has added support for the Main 10 profile of HEVC and the Rec. 2020 color space.

On December 10, 2014 Better Portable Graphics was announced, an HEVC-based still image format offering significantly better quality than JPEG at the same file size.

In late December 2014, Google releases Android 5.0 "Lollipop" which includes APIs for HEVC.

=== 2015 ===
On January 5, 2015, ViXS Systems announced the XCode 6800 which is the first SoC to support the Main 12 profile of HEVC.

In January, 2015, Intel released a new driver version for its HD Graphics (Haswell and Broadwell) allowing hardware decoding support for HEVC.

On January 22, 2015, Nvidia released their GeForce GTX 960 mainstream video card which includes a fixed function HEVC Main/Main10 hardware decoder.

On March 9, 2015, Nvidia released VDPAU version 1.0 which supports HEVC decoding for the Main, Main 4:4:4, Main Still Picture, Main 10, and Main 12 profiles.

On March 31, 2015, VITEC announced the MGW Ace which was the first 100% hardware-based portable HEVC encoder that provides mobile HEVC encoding.

In June 2015, Nvidia released their Shield gaming/streaming media console, which supports HEVC decode and 4K video.

On 6 June 2015, Microsoft updated the Xbox One to support 10-bit HEVC decoding.

On August 5, 2015, Intel launched Skylake products with full fixed function Main/8bit decoding/encoding and hybrid/partial Main10/10bit decoding.

On August 20, 2015, Nvidia released the GeForce GTX 950 (GM206), which includes full fixed function HEVC Main/Main10 hardware decoder like the GTX 960.

On November 10, 2015, Qualcomm Detailed Snapdragon 820 Smartphone SoC which is the first chip in the series to support 4K HEVC 10bit decoding.

=== 2016 ===
On April 11, 2016, full HEVC (H.265) support was announced in the newest MythTV version (0.28).

On May 27, 2016, Nvidia released the GeForce GTX 1080 (GP104), which includes full fixed function HEVC Main10/Main12 hardware decoder.

On June 10, 2016, Nvidia released the GeForce GTX 1070 (GP104), which includes full fixed function HEVC Main10/Main12 hardware decoder.

On July 19, 2016, Nvidia released the GeForce GTX 1060 (GP106), which includes full fixed function HEVC Main10/Main12 hardware decoder.

On August 2, 2016, Nvidia released the NVIDIA TITAN X (GP102), which includes full fixed function HEVC Main10/Main12 hardware decoder.

On August 30, 2016, Intel officially announced 7th generation Core CPUs (Kaby Lake) products with full fixed function HEVC Main10 hardware decoding support.

On September 7, 2016, BBC R&D announced and made the source code available for the Turing Codec, an open source HEVC encoder.

On October 25, 2016, Nvidia released the GeForce GTX 1050 Ti (GP107) & GeForce GTX 1050 (GP107), which includes full fixed function HEVC Main10/Main12 hardware decoder.

On November 6, 2016, Google released the Chromecast Ultra, which features "expanded codec support" for hardware HEVC Main/Main10 decoding.

=== 2017 ===
On January 3, 2017, Intel officially announced 7th generation Core CPUs (Kaby Lake) desktop products with full fixed function HEVC Main10 hardware decoding support.

On March 10, 2017, Nvidia released the GeForce GTX 1080 Ti (GP102), which includes full fixed function HEVC Main10/Main12 hardware decoder.

On April 6, 2017, Nvidia released the NVIDIA TITAN Xp (GP102), which includes full fixed function HEVC Main10/Main12 hardware decoder.

On May 17, 2017, Nvidia released the GeForce GT 1030 (GP108), which includes full fixed function HEVC Main10/Main12 hardware decoder.

On June 5, 2017, Apple announced HEVC and HEIF support in macOS High Sierra and iOS 11.

On August 21, 2017, Intel officially unveiled their 8th generation Core CPUs (Kaby Lake Refresh) mobile products with full fixed function HEVC Main10 hardware decoding support.

On September 19, 2017, Apple released iOS 11 with full HEVC encoding and decoding support. Prior to this, HEVC support was limited to FaceTime.

On September 25, 2017, Apple released macOS High Sierra with HEVC encoding and decoding support.

On September 26, 2017, Microsoft released Windows 10 Fall Creators Update (version 1709), which removed the out-of-the-box HEVC support, to Windows Insiders. When questioned about the removal, a Microsoft employee claimed that it happened because HEVC (and HEIC) files were only supported by Apple devices. A replacement, called “HEVC Video Extension”, was added to Windows Store, at first for free. With a later version, now named “HEVC Video Extensions” (plural form), it became paid software, costing US$0.99. A separate version called “HEVC Video Extensions from Device Manufacturer”, presumably intended for computers with HEVC support in hardware, is still available for free.

On September 28, 2017, GoPro released the Hero6 Black action camera, with 4K60P HEVC video encoding.

On October 5, 2017, Intel officially launched their 8th generation Core CPUs (Coffee Lake) desktop products with full fixed function HEVC Main10 hardware decoding support.

On November 2, 2017, Nvidia released the GeForce GTX 1070 Ti (GP104), which includes full fixed function HEVC Main10/Main12 hardware decoder.

On December 11, 2017, Intel officially launched their Pentium Silver & Celeron CPUs (Gemini Lake) desktop & mobile products with full fixed function HEVC Main10 hardware decoding support.

=== 2018 ===
On April 9, 2018, Pathpartner Technology Pvt Ltd., announced free instance of HEVC decoder on Amazon Web Services.

On August 28, 2018, Intel officially unveiled their 8th generation Core CPUs (Whiskey Lake & Amber Lake) mobile products with full fixed function HEVC Main10 hardware decoding support.

On September 20, 2018, Nvidia released the GeForce RTX 2080 (TU104), which includes full fixed function HEVC Main 4:4:4 12 hardware decoder.

On September 27, 2018, Nvidia released the GeForce RTX 2080 Ti (TU102), which includes full fixed function HEVC Main 4:4:4 12 hardware decoder.

On October 17, 2018, Nvidia released the GeForce RTX 2070 (TU106), which includes full fixed function HEVC Main 4:4:4 12 hardware decoder.

On October 19, 2018, Intel officially launched their 9th generation Core CPUs (Coffee Lake Refresh) 9900K, 9700K & 9600K desktop products with full fixed function HEVC Main10 hardware decoding support.

=== 2019 ===
On January 15, 2019, Nvidia released the GeForce RTX 2060 (TU106), which includes full fixed function HEVC Main 4:4:4 12 hardware decoder.

On February 22, 2019, Nvidia released the GeForce GTX 1660 Ti (TU116), which includes full fixed function HEVC Main 4:4:4 12 hardware decoder.

On March 14, 2019, Nvidia released the GeForce GTX 1660 (TU116), which includes full fixed function HEVC Main 4:4:4 12 hardware decoder.

On April 23, 2019, Nvidia released the GeForce GTX 1650 (TU117), which includes full fixed function HEVC Main 4:4:4 12 hardware decoder.

On April 23, 2019, Intel officially launched their 9th generation Core CPUs (Coffee Lake Refresh) desktop & mobile products with full fixed function HEVC Main10 hardware decoding support.

On July 9, 2019, Nvidia released the GeForce RTX 2070 Super (TU104) & GeForce RTX 2060 Super (TU106), which includes full fixed function HEVC Main 4:4:4 12 hardware decoder.

On July 23, 2019, Nvidia released the GeForce RTX 2080 Super (TU104), which includes full fixed function HEVC Main 4:4:4 12 hardware decoder.

On August 1, 2019, Intel officially launched their 10th generation Core CPUs (Ice Lake) mobile products with full fixed function HEVC Main10 hardware decoding support.

On August 21, 2019, Intel officially launched their 10th generation Core CPUs (Comet Lake) mobile products with full fixed function HEVC Main10 hardware decoding support.

On October 29, 2019, Nvidia released the GeForce GTX 1660 Super (TU116), which includes full fixed function HEVC Main 4:4:4 12 hardware decoder.

On November 4, 2019, Intel officially launched their Pentium Silver & Celeron CPUs (Gemini Lake Refresh) desktop & mobile products with full fixed function HEVC Main10 hardware decoding support.

On November 22, 2019, Nvidia released the GeForce GTX 1650 Super (TU116), which includes full fixed function HEVC Main 4:4:4 12 hardware decoder.

=== 2020 ===
On April 2, 2020, Intel officially launched their 10th generation Core CPUs (Comet Lake-H series) mobile products with full fixed function HEVC Main10 hardware decoding support.

On April 30, 2020, Intel officially launched their 10th generation Core CPUs (Comet Lake-S series) desktop products with full fixed function HEVC Main10 hardware decoding support.

== See also ==
- High Efficiency Video Coding
- UHDTV - Digital video formats with resolutions of 4K (3840×2160) and 8K (7680×4320)
- Rec. 2020 - ITU-R Recommendation for UHDTV
- H.264/MPEG-4 AVC - The predecessor video standard of HEVC
- X264 - Free Open source implementation of H264 encoder
- X265 - Free Open source implementation of H265 encoder
- VP9
