= Nvidia RTX =

Development platform for rendering graphics

RTX
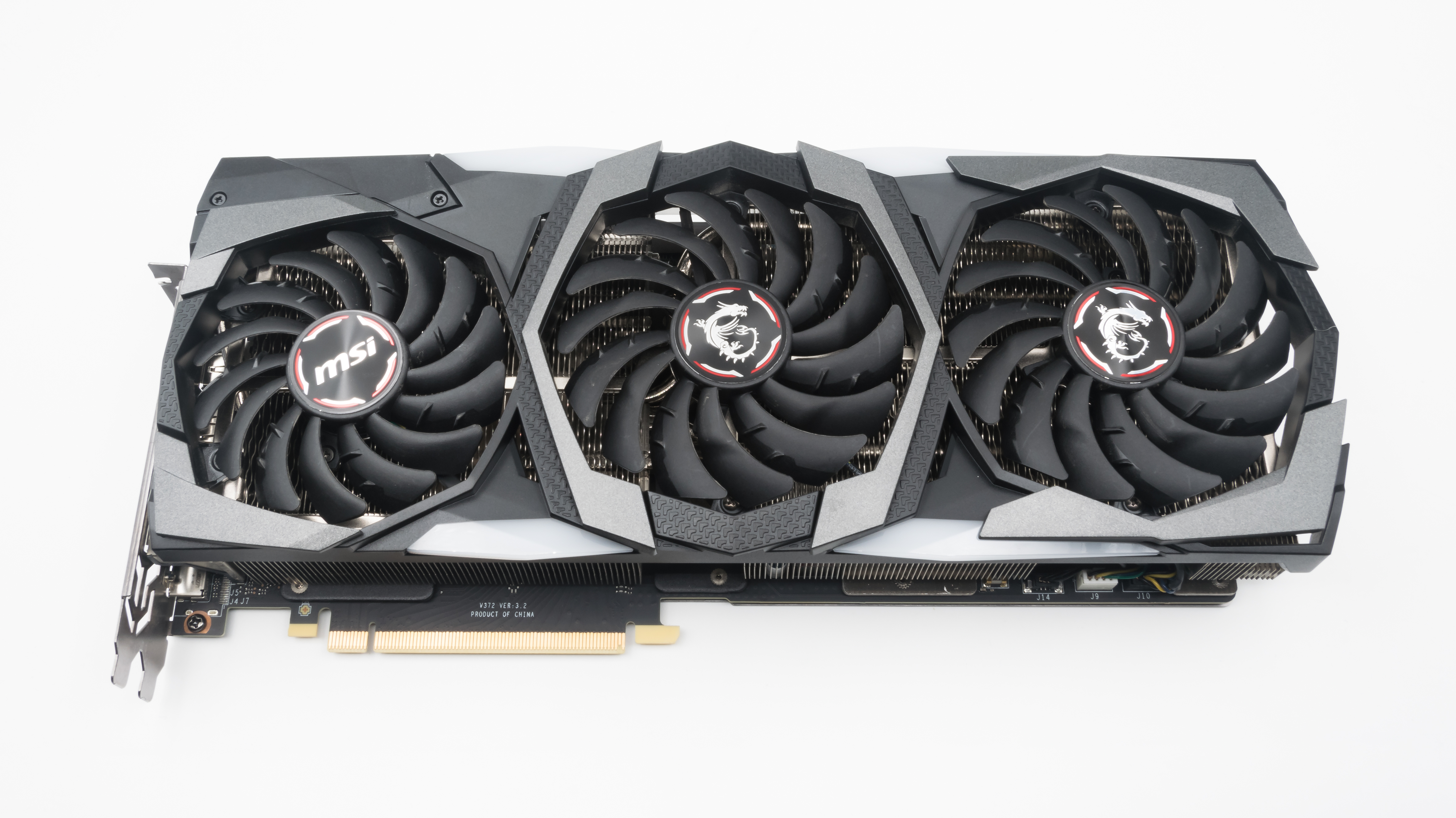
- Nvidia GeForce RTX 2080 from MSI, released in 2018. The GPUs of the GeForce 20 series are the first of Nvidia's RTX line of hardware.
- Release date: September 20, 2018; 7 years ago

History
- Predecessor: Quadro

Nvidia RTX (also known as Nvidia GeForce RTX under the GeForce brand) is a professional visual computing platform created by Nvidia, used in mainstream PCs for gaming as well as being used in workstations for designing complex large-scale models in architecture and product design, scientific visualization, energy exploration, and film and video production (especially under the RTX PRO and formerly Quadro RTX brands).

Nvidia RTX features hardware-enabled real-time ray tracing. Historically, ray tracing had been reserved to non-real time applications (like CGI in visual effects for movies and in photorealistic renderings), with video games having to rely on direct lighting and precalculated indirect contribution for their rendering. RTX facilitates a new development in computer graphics of generating interactive images that react to lighting, shadows and reflections. RTX runs on Nvidia Volta-, Turing-, Ampere-, Ada Lovelace- and Blackwell-based GPUs, specifically utilizing the Tensor cores (and new RT cores on Turing and successors) on the architectures for ray-tracing acceleration.

In March 2019, Nvidia announced that selected GTX 10 series (Pascal) and GTX 16 series (Turing) cards would receive support for subsets of RTX technology in upcoming drivers, although functions and performance will be affected by their lack of dedicated hardware cores for ray tracing.

In October 2020, Nvidia announced Nvidia RTX A6000 as the first Ampere-architecture-based graphics card for use in professional workstations in the Nvidia RTX product line, replacing the former Quadro product line of professional graphics cards.

Nvidia worked with Microsoft to integrate RTX support with Microsoft's DirectX Raytracing API (DXR). RTX is currently available through Nvidia OptiX and for DirectX. For the Turing and Ampere architectures, it is also available for Vulkan.

== Components ==
In addition to ray tracing, RTX includes artificial intelligence integration, common asset formats, rasterization (CUDA) support, and simulation APIs. The components of RTX are:

- AI-accelerated features (NGX)
- Asset formats (USD and MDL)
- Rasterization including advanced shaders
- Raytracing via OptiX, Microsoft DXR and Vulkan
- Simulation tools:
  - CUDA 10
  - Flex
  - PhysX

== Features and software ==
=== Ray tracing ===
In computer graphics, ray tracing generates an image by tracing rays cast through pixels of an image plane and simulating the effects of its encounters with virtual objects. This enables advanced effects that better reflect real-world optical properties, such as softer and more realistic shadows and reflections, as compared to traditional rasterization techniques which prioritize performance over accuracy.

Nvidia RTX achieves this through a combination of hardware and software acceleration. On a hardware level, RTX cards feature fixed-function "RT cores" that are designed to accelerate mathematical operations needed to simulate rays, such as bounding volume hierarchy traversal. The software implementation is open to individual application developers. As ray-tracing is still computationally intensive, many developers choose to take a hybrid rendering approach where certain graphical effects, such as shadows and reflections, are performed using ray-tracing, while the remaining scene is rendered using the more performant rasterization.

==== Optix ====
Nvidia OptiX is part of Nvidia DesignWorks. OptiX is a high-level, or "to-the-algorithm" API, meaning that it is designed to encapsulate the entire algorithm of which ray tracing is a part, not just the ray tracing itself. This is meant to allow the OptiX engine to execute the larger algorithm without application-side changes.

Aside from computer graphics rendering, OptiX also helps in optical and acoustical design, radiation and electromagnetic research, artificial intelligence queries and collision analysis.

=== Chat with RTX ===
Chat with RTX is an AI-based assistant that runs locally on the user's Windows PC. It uses a large language model and requires an RTX 30, 40 or 50 series GPU with at least 8GB of VRAM. It can be downloaded from Nvidia's website.

=== RTX Remix ===
RTX Remix is a game modding platform designed by Nvidia to remaster older titles by implementing modern technologies such as ray tracing, DLSS, and enhanced assets.

== List of Nvidia RTX cards ==
Nvidia has released many cards that support RTX, including the 20, 30, 40, and 50 series:

- Nvidia GeForce RTX 20 series
  - Nvidia GeForce RTX 2050 Mobile
  - Nvidia GeForce RTX 2060
  - Nvidia GeForce RTX 2060 TU104
  - Nvidia GeForce RTX 2060 12GB
  - Nvidia GeForce RTX 2060 Super
  - Nvidia GeForce RTX 2070
  - Nvidia GeForce RTX 2070 Super
  - Nvidia GeForce RTX 2080
  - Nvidia GeForce RTX 2080 Super
  - Nvidia GeForce RTX 2080 Ti
  - Nvidia Titan RTX
- Nvidia GeForce RTX 30 series
  - Nvidia GeForce RTX 3050 4GB
  - Nvidia GeForce RTX 3050 6GB
  - Nvidia GeForce RTX 3050 8GB GA107
  - Nvidia GeForce RTX 3050 8GB
  - Nvidia GeForce RTX 3060 8GB
  - Nvidia GeForce RTX 3060 12GB
  - Nvidia GeForce RTX 3060 12GB GA104
  - Nvidia GeForce RTX 3060 Ti
  - Nvidia GeForce RTX 3060 Ti GDDR6X
  - Nvidia GeForce RTX 3070
  - Nvidia GeForce RTX 3070 Ti
  - Nvidia GeForce RTX 3070 Ti GA102
  - Nvidia GeForce RTX 3080 10GB
  - Nvidia GeForce RTX 3080 12GB
  - Nvidia GeForce RTX 3080 Ti
  - Nvidia GeForce RTX 3090
  - Nvidia GeForce RTX 3090 Ti
- Nvidia GeForce RTX 40 series
  - Nvidia GeForce RTX 4060
  - Nvidia GeForce RTX 4060 GA106
  - Nvidia GeForce RTX 4060 Ti 8GB
  - Nvidia GeForce RTX 4060 Ti 8GB GA104
  - Nvidia GeForce RTX 4060 Ti 16GB
  - Nvidia GeForce RTX 4070 20GBPs GDDR6
  - Nvidia GeForce RTX 4070
  - Nvidia GeForce RTX 4070 AD103
  - Nvidia GeForce RTX 4070 Super
  - Nvidia GeForce RTX 4070 Ti
  - Nvidia GeForce RTX 4070 Ti Super
  - Nvidia GeForce RTX 4070 Ti Super AD102
  - Nvidia GeForce RTX 4080
  - Nvidia GeForce RTX 4080 Super
  - Nvidia GeForce RTX 4090D
  - Nvidia GeForce RTX 4090
- Nvidia GeForce RTX 50 series
  - Nvidia GeForce RTX 5050
  - Nvidia GeForce RTX 5050 9GB
  - Nvidia GeForce RTX 5060
  - Nvidia GeForce RTX 5060 GB205
  - Nvidia GeForce RTX 5060 Ti 8GB
  - Nvidia GeForce RTX 5060 Ti 16GB
  - Nvidia GeForce RTX 5070
  - Nvidia GeForce RTX 5070 Ti
  - Nvidia GeForce RTX 5080
  - Nvidia GeForce RTX 5090D
  - Nvidia GeForce RTX 5090D v2 24 GB
  - Nvidia GeForce RTX 5090
- Nvidia RTX for Workstations
  - Nvidia Quadro RTX 4000 8 GB
  - Nvidia Quadro RTX 5000 16 GB
  - Nvidia Quadro RTX 6000 24 GB
  - Nvidia Quadro RTX 8000 48 GB
  - Nvidia RTX A400 4 GB
  - Nvidia RTX A1000 8 GB
  - Nvidia RTX A2000 6 GB/12 GB
  - Nvidia RTX A4000 16 GB
  - Nvidia RTX A4500 20 GB
  - Nvidia RTX A5000 24 GB
  - Nvidia RTX A5500 24 GB
  - Nvidia RTX A6000 48 GB
  - Nvidia RTX 2000 Ada Generation 16 GB
  - Nvidia RTX 4000 SFF Ada Generation 20 GB
  - Nvidia RTX 4000 Ada Generation 20 GB
  - Nvidia RTX 4500 Ada Generation 24 GB
  - Nvidia RTX 5000 Ada Generation 32 GB
  - Nvidia RTX 5880 Ada Generation 48 GB
  - Nvidia RTX 6000 Ada Generation 48 GB
  - Nvidia RTX Pro 2000 Blackwell 16 GB
  - Nvidia RTX Pro 4000 Blackwell SFF 24 GB
  - Nvidia RTX Pro 4000 Blackwell 24 GB
  - Nvidia RTX Pro 4500 Blackwell Workstation Edition 32 GB
  - Nvidia RTX Pro 5000 Blackwell 48 GB/72 GB
  - Nvidia RTX Pro 6000 Blackwell Max-Q Workstation Edition 96 GB
  - Nvidia RTX Pro 6000 Blackwell Workstation Edition 96 GB
- Nvidia RTX for Servers
  - Nvidia A2
  - Nvidia A10
  - Nvidia A16
  - Nvidia A40
  - Nvidia L4
  - Nvidia L20
  - Nvidia L40
  - Nvidia RTX Pro 4500 Blackwell Server Edition
  - Nvidia RTX 6000D
  - Nvidia RTX Pro 6000 Blackwell Server Edition
