= A2000 =

A2000 may refer to:

- A2000 road, a road in Great Britain connecting Crayford and Slade Green
- Amiga 2000, a computer released in 1987
- Nvidia RTX A2000, an Nvidia RTX GPU
