= GeForce RTX 20 series =

Series of GPUs by Nvidia

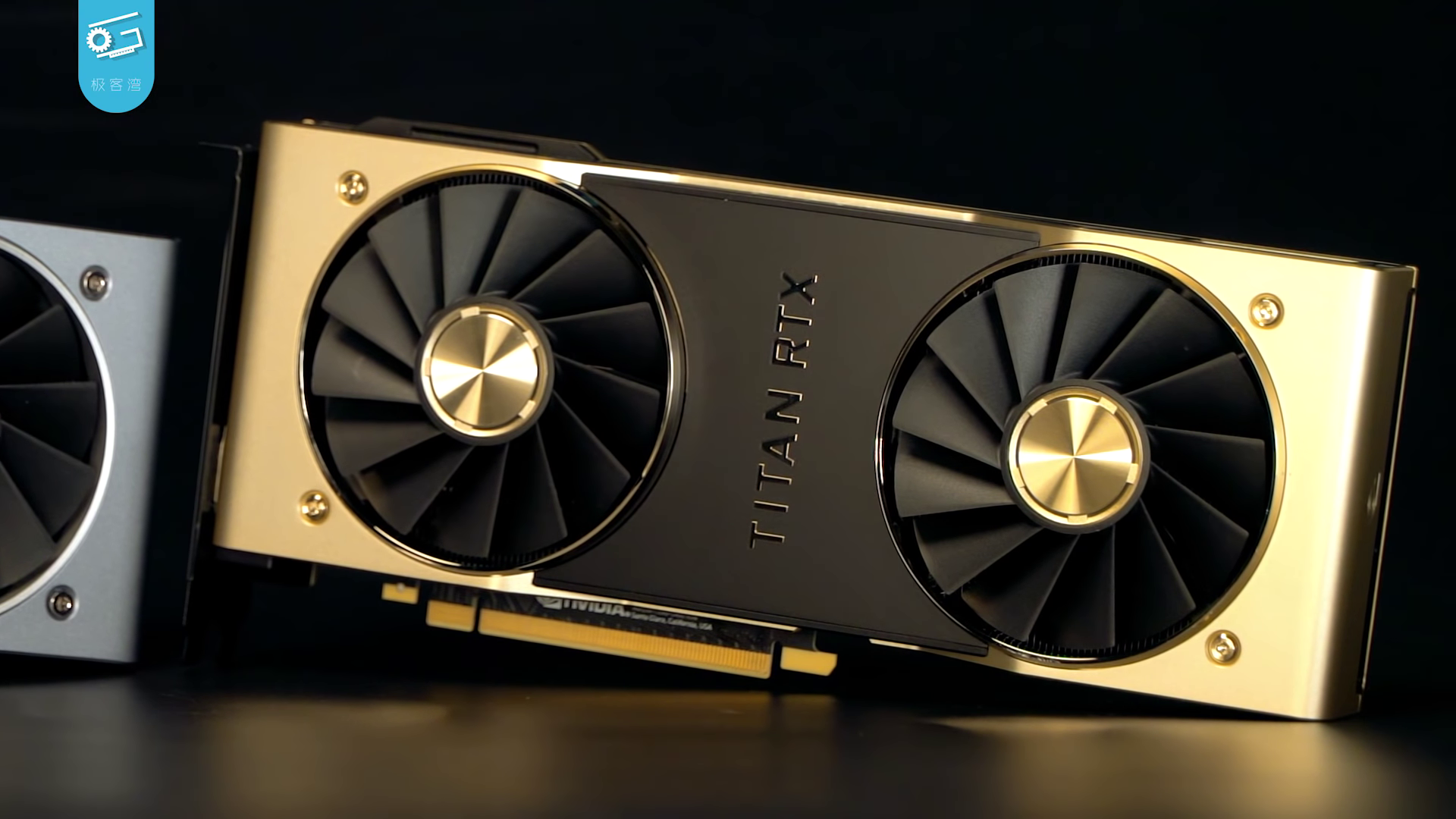
- Top: Logo of the series Bottom: A Titan RTX released in 2018, the series' flagship model
- Release date: September 20, 2018; 8 years ago; July 9, 2019; 7 years ago (Super refresh)
- Discontinued: November 28, 2022; 3 years ago
- Manufactured by: TSMC
- Designed by: Nvidia
- Marketed by: Nvidia
- Codename: TU10x
- Architecture: Turing; Ampere (only RTX 2050 Mobile)
- Models: GeForce RTX series
- Transistors: 10.8B (TU106); 13.6B (TU104); 18.6B (TU102)
- Fabrication process: TSMC 12 nm (FinFET)

Cards
- Entry-level: GeForce RTX 2050; (Laptop only): GeForce RTX 2060; GeForce RTX 2060 (12 GB)
- Mid-range: GeForce RTX 2060 Super
- High-end: GeForce RTX 2070; GeForce RTX 2070 Super; GeForce RTX 2080; GeForce RTX 2080 Super
- Enthusiast: GeForce RTX 2080 Ti; Nvidia Titan RTX

API support
- Direct3D: Direct3D 12.0 (feature level 12_2); Shader Model 6.8
- OpenCL: OpenCL 3.0 (Note: In OpenCL 3.0, OpenCL 1.2 functionality has become a mandatory baseline, while all OpenCL 2.x and OpenCL 3.0 features were made optional.)
- OpenGL: OpenGL 4.6
- Vulkan: Vulkan 1.4

History
- Predecessor: GeForce 10 series
- Variant: GeForce GTX 16 series
- Successor: GeForce RTX 30 series

Support status
- Supported

The GeForce RTX 20 series is a family of graphics processing units developed by Nvidia. The line started shipping on September 20, 2018, and after several editions, on July 2, 2019, the GeForce RTX Super line of cards was announced.

The 20 series marked the introduction of Nvidia's Turing microarchitecture, and the first generation of RTX cards, the first in the industry to implement hardware-enabled real-time ray tracing in a consumer product. In a departure from Nvidia's usual strategy, the 20 series has no entry-level range, leaving it to the GeForce GTX 16 series to cover this segment of the market.

These cards are succeeded by the GeForce RTX 30 series, powered by the Ampere microarchitecture, which first launched in 2020.

== History ==
=== Announcement ===
On August 14, 2018, Nvidia teased the announcement of the first card in the 20 series, the GeForce RTX 2080, shortly after introducing the Turing architecture at SIGGRAPH earlier that year. The GeForce RTX 20 series was finally announced at Gamescom on August 20, 2018, becoming the first line of graphics cards "designed to handle real-time ray tracing" thanks to the "inclusion of dedicated tensor and RT cores."

In August 2018, it was reported that Nvidia had trademarked GeForce RTX and Quadro RTX as names.

=== Release ===
The line started shipping on September 20, 2018. Serving as the successor to the GeForce 10 series, the 20 series marked the introduction of Nvidia's Turing microarchitecture, and the first generation of RTX cards, the first in the industry to implement realtime hardware ray tracing in a consumer product.

Released in late 2018, the RTX 2080 was marketed as up to 75% faster than the GTX 1080 in various games, also describing the chip as "the most significant generational upgrade to its GPUs since the first CUDA cores in 2006," according to PC Gamer.

After the initial release, factory overclocked versions were released in the late 2018. The first was the "Ti" edition, while the Founders Edition cards were overclocked by default and had a three-year warranty. When the GeForce RTX 2080 Ti came out, TechRadar called it "the world's most powerful GPU on the market." The GeForce RTX 2080 Founders Edition was positively reviewed for performance by PC Gamer on September 19, 2018, but was criticized for the high cost to consumers, also noting that its ray tracing feature wasn't yet utilized by many programs or games. In January 2019, Tom's Hardware also stated the GeForce RTX 2080 Ti Xtreme was "the fastest gaming graphics card available," although it criticized the loudness of the cooling solution, the size and heat output in PC cases. In August 2018, the company claimed that the GeForce RTX graphics cards were the "world's first graphics cards to feature super-fast GDDR6 memory, a new DisplayPort 1.4 output that can drive up to 8K HDR at 60 Hz on future-generation monitors with just a single cable, and a USB Type-C output for next-generation Virtual Reality headsets."

In October 2018, PC Gamer reported the supply of the 2080 Ti card was "extremely tight" after availability had already been delayed. By November 2018, MSI was offering nine different RTX 2080-based graphics cards. Released in December 2018, the line's Titan RTX was initially priced at $2500, significantly more than the $1300 then needed for a GeForce RTX 2080 Ti.

=== Marketing ===
In January 2019, Nvidia announced that GeForce RTX graphics cards would be used in 40 new laptops from various companies. Also that month, in response to negative reactions to the pricing of the GeForce RTX cards, Nvidia CEO Jensen Huang stated "They were right. [We] were anxious to get RTX in the mainstream market... We just weren't ready. Now we're ready, and it's called 2060," in reference to the RTX 2060. In May 2019, a TechSpot review noted that the newly released Radeon VII by AMD was comparable in speeds to the GeForce RTX 2080, if slightly slower in games, with both priced similarly and framed as direct competitors.

On July 2, 2019, the GeForce RTX Super line of cards was announced, which comprises higher-spec versions of the 2060, 2070 and 2080. Each of the Super models were offered for a similar price as older models but with improved specs. In July 2019, NVidia stated the "SUPER" graphics cards in the GeForce RTX 20 series, to be introduced, had a 15% performance advantage over the GeForce RTX 2060. PC World called the super editions a "modest" upgrade for the price, and the 2080 Super chip the "second most-powerful GPU ever released" in terms of speed. In November 2019, PC Gamer wrote "even without an overclock, the 2080 Ti is the best graphics card for gaming." In June 2020, PC Mag listed the Nvidia GeForce RTX 2070 Super as one of the "best [8] graphics cards for 4k gaming in 2020." The GeForce RTX 2080 Founders Edition, Super, and Ti were also listed. In June 2020, graphic cards including the RTX 2060, RTX 2060 Super, RTX 2070 and the RTX 2080 Super were announced as discounted by retailers in expectation of the GeForce RTX 3080 launch. In April 2020, Nvidia announced 100 new laptops licensed to include either GeForce GTX and RTX models.

== Architecture ==
The RTX 20 series is based on the Turing microarchitecture and features real-time hardware ray tracing. The cards are manufactured on an optimized 14 nm node from TSMC, named 12 nm FinFET NVIDIA (FFN). New example features in Turing included mesh shaders, Ray tracing (RT) cores (bounding volume hierarchy acceleration), tensor (AI) cores, optical flow acceleration, dedicated Integer (INT) cores for concurrent execution of integer and floating-point operations. In the GeForce RTX 20 series, this real-time ray tracing is accelerated by the use of new RT cores, which are designed to process quadtrees and spherical hierarchies, and speed up collision tests with individual triangles.

The ray tracing performed by the RT cores can be used to produce effects such as reflections, refractions, shadows, depth of field, light scattering and caustics, replacing traditional raster techniques such as cube maps and depth maps. Notes: Instead of replacing rasterization entirely, however, ray tracing is offered in a hybrid model, in which the information gathered from ray tracing can be used to augment the rasterized shading for more photo-realistic results.

The second generation Tensor Cores (succeeding Volta's) work in cooperation with the RT cores, and their AI features are used mainly to two ends: firstly, de-noising a partially ray traced image by filling in the blanks between rays cast; also another application of the Tensor cores is DLSS (deep learning super-sampling), a new method to replace anti-aliasing, by artificially generating detail to upscale the rendered image into a higher resolution. The Tensor cores apply deep learning models (for example, an image resolution enhancement model) which are constructed using supercomputers. The problem to be solved is analyzed on the supercomputer, which is taught by example what results are desired. The supercomputer then outputs a model which is then executed on the consumer's Tensor cores. These methods are delivered to consumers as part of the cards' drivers.

Nvidia segregates the GPU dies for Turing into A and non-A variants, which is appended or excluded on the hundreds part of the GPU code name. Non-A variants are not allowed to be factory overclocked, whilst A variants are.

The GeForce RTX 20 series was launched with GDDR6 memory chips from Micron Technology. However, due to reported faults with launch models, Nvidia switched to using GDDR6 memory chips from Samsung Electronics by November 2018.

== Software ==
With the GeForce RTX 20 series, Nvidia introduced the RTX development platform. RTX uses Microsoft's DXR, Nvidia's OptiX, and Vulkan for access to ray tracing. The ray tracing technology used in the RTX Turing GPUs was in development at Nvidia for 10 years. Nvidia's Nsight Visual Studio Edition application is used to inspect the state of the GPUs.

== Products ==
All of the cards in the series have a PCIe 3.0 x16 interface, which connects it to the CPU, manufactured using a 12 nm FinFET process from TSMC, and use GDDR6 memory (initially Micron modules upon launch, and later Samsung modules from November 2018).

=== Gallery ===
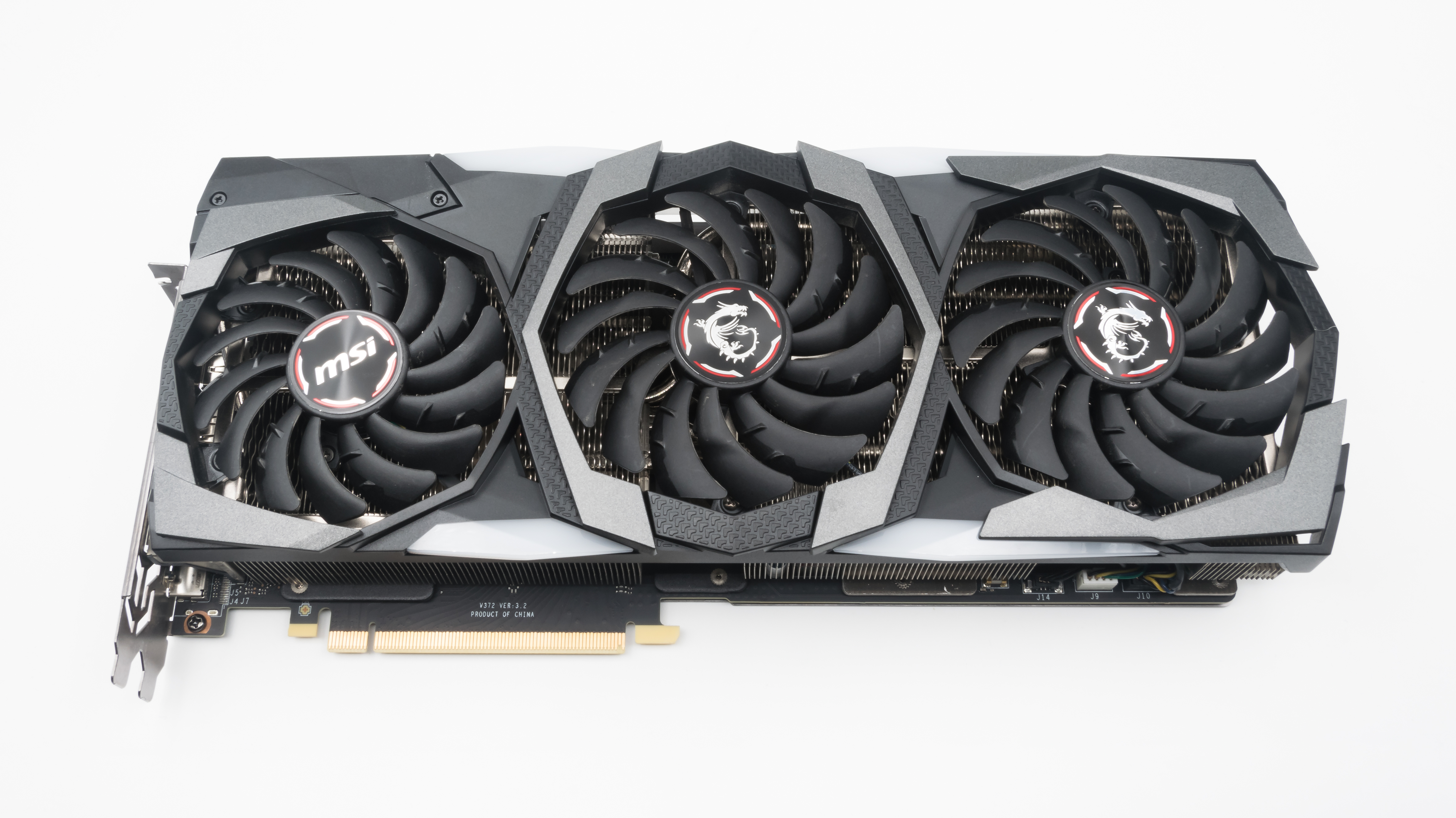
Nvidia GeForce RTX 2080 Gaming X Trio. This particular model manufactured by Nvidia board-partner, MSI.

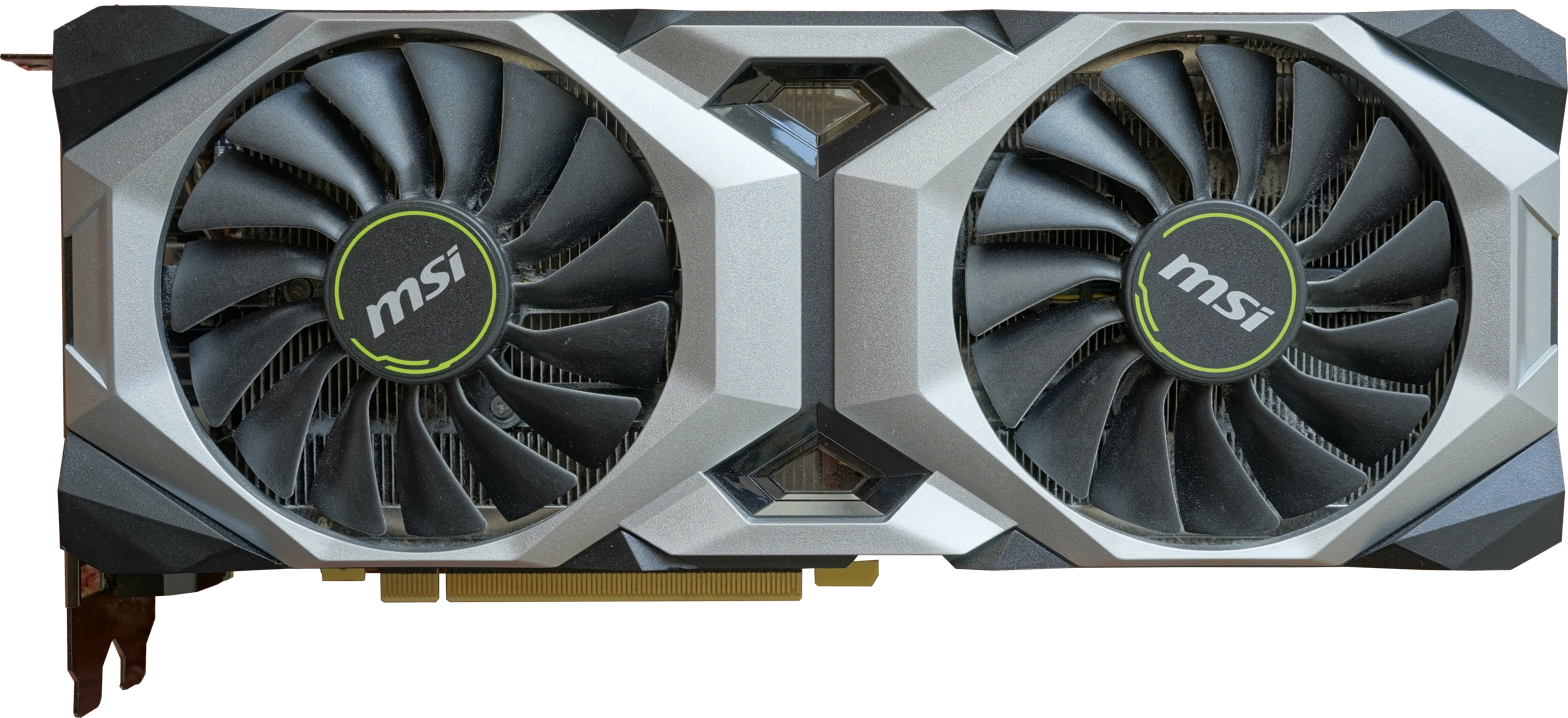
Nvidia GeForce RTX 2080 VENTUS OC Edition, manufactured by board-partner MSI

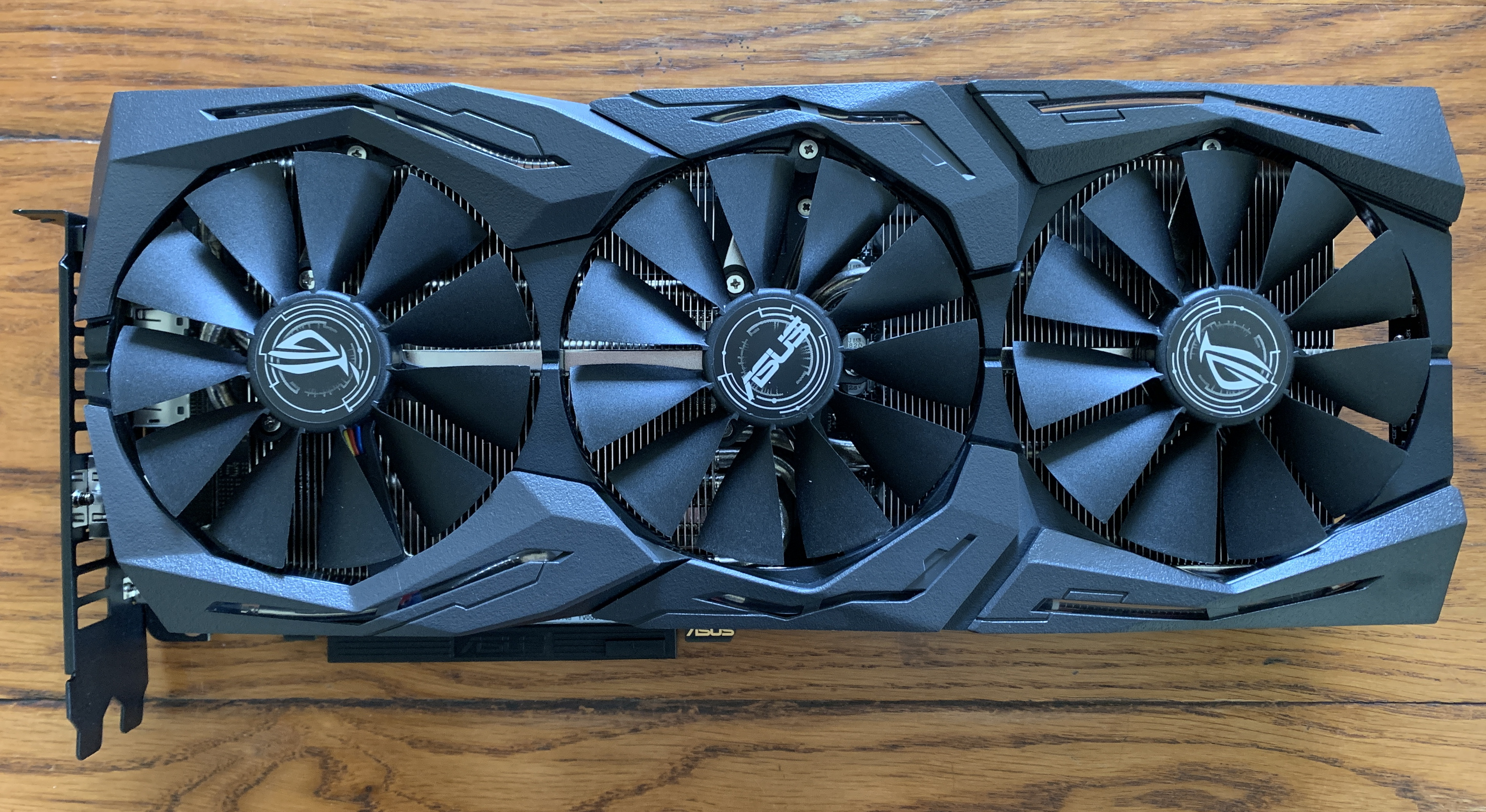
Nvidia GeForce RTX 2070 ROG Edition. This particular model manufactured by Nvidia board-partner, ASUS.

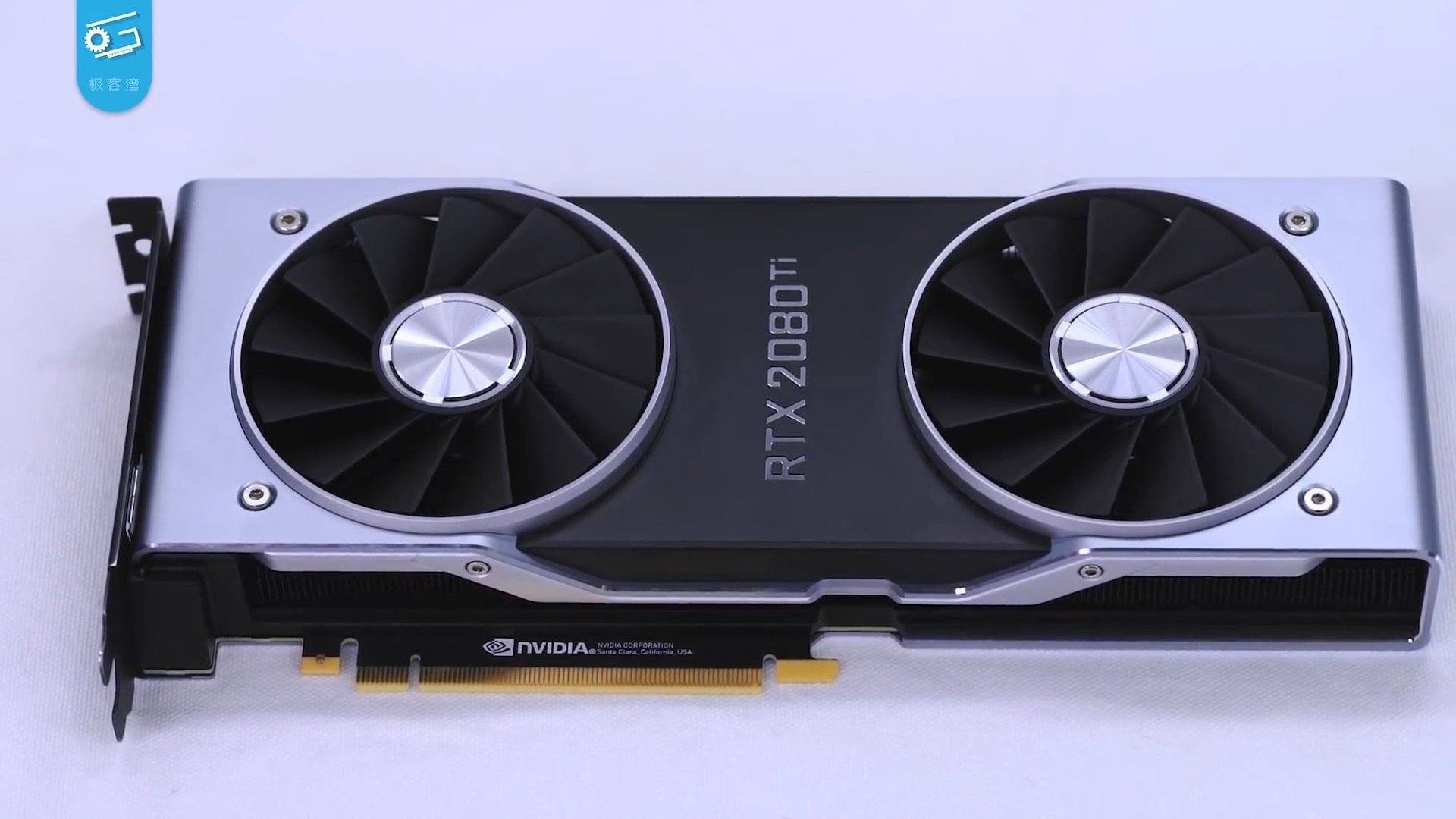
Nvidia GeForce RTX 2080 Ti Founders Edition

=== Desktop ===
- Double-precision (FP64) performance of Turing silicon is 1/32 of single-precision (FP32) performance.

Model	Launch date	Launch MSRP (USD)	Code name(s)	Transistors (billion)	Die size (mm^{2})	Core config (Note: Shader Processors, Texture mapping units: Render output units: Ray tracing cores: Tensor Cores (A Tensor core is a mixed-precision FPU specifically designed for matrix arithmetic.))	SM count (Note: The number of Streaming multi-processors on the GPU.)	L2 cache	Clock speeds (Note: Core boost values (if available) are stated below the base value inside brackets.)		Fillrate (Note: Pixel fillrate is calculated as the number of ROPs multiplied by the base (or boost) core clock speed.) (Note: Texture fillrate is calculated as the number of TMUs multiplied by the base (or boost) core clock speed.)		Memory			Processing power (TFLOPS)			Ray tracing performance			TDP	NVLink support
Model	Launch date	Launch MSRP (USD)	Code name(s)	Transistors (billion)	Die size (mm^{2})	Core config	SM count	L2 cache	Core (MHz)	Memory (MT/s)	Pixel (GP/s)	Texture (GT/s)	Size	Bandwidth (GB/s)	Bus width	Half precision (boost)	Single precision (boost)	Double precision (boost)	Rays/s (billions)	RTX-OPS (trillions)	Tensor TFLOPS	TDP	NVLink support
GeForce RTX 2060	Jan 15, 2019	349	TU106-200A	10.8	445	1920; 120:48:30:240	30	3 MB	1365 (1680)	14000	65.52	163.8	6 GB	336	192-bit	10.483 (12.902)	5.242 (6.451)	0.164 (0.202)	5	37	51.6	160 W	No
GeForce RTX 2060	Jan 10, 2020	300	TU104-150	13.6	545	1920; 120:48:30:240	30	3 MB	1365 (1680)	14000	65.52	163.8	6 GB	336	192-bit	10.483 (12.902)	5.242 (6.451)	0.164 (0.202)	5	37	51.6	160 W	No
GeForce RTX 2060 (12 GB)	Dec 7, 2021	?	TU106-300	10.8	445	2176; 136:48:34:272	34	3 MB	1470 (1650)	14000	79.2	224.4	12 GB	336	192-bit	12.246 (14.362)	6.123 (7.181)	0.191 (0.224)	6	41	57.4	185 W	No
GeForce RTX 2060 Super	Jul 9, 2019	399	TU106-410	10.8	445	2176; 136:64:34:272	34	4 MB	1470 (1650)	14000	94.05	199.9	8 GB	448	256-bit	12.246 (14.362)	6.123 (7.181)	0.191 (0.224)	6	41	57.4	175 W	No
GeForce RTX 2070	Oct 17, 2018	499	TU106-400	10.8	445	2304; 144:64:36:288	36	4 MB	1410 (1620)	14000	90.24	203.04	8 GB	448	256-bit	12.994 (14.930)	6.497 (7.465)	0.203 (0.233)	6	45	59.7	175 W	No
GeForce RTX 2070	Oct 17, 2018	599	TU106-400A	10.8	445	2304; 144:64:36:288	36	4 MB	1410 (1620)	14000	90.24	203.04	8 GB	448	256-bit	12.994 (14.930)	6.497 (7.465)	0.203 (0.233)	6	45	59.7	175 W	No
GeForce RTX 2070 Super	Jul 9, 2019	499	TU104-410	13.6	545	2560; 160:64:40:320	40	4 MB	1605 (1770)	14000	102.72	256.8	8 GB	448	256-bit	16.435 (18.125)	8.218 (9.062)	0.257 (0.283)	7	52	72.5	215 W	2-way
GeForce RTX 2080	Sep 20, 2018	699	TU104-400	13.6	545	2944; 184:64:46:368	46	4 MB	1515 (1710)	14000	96.96	278.76	8 GB	448	256-bit	17.840 (20.137)	8.920 (10.068)	0.279 (0.315)	8	60	80.5	215 W	2-way
GeForce RTX 2080	Sep 20, 2018	799	TU104-400A	13.6	545	2944; 184:64:46:368	46	4 MB	1515 (1710)	14000	96.96	278.76	8 GB	448	256-bit	17.840 (20.137)	8.920 (10.068)	0.279 (0.315)	8	60	80.5	215 W	2-way
GeForce RTX 2080 Super	Jul 23, 2019	699	TU104-450	13.6	545	3072; 192:64:48:384	48	4 MB	1650 (1815)	15500	105.6	316.8	8 GB	496	256-bit	20.275 (22.303)	10.138 (11.151)	0.317 (0.349)	8	63	89.2	250 W	2-way
GeForce RTX 2080 Ti	Sep 27, 2018	999	TU102-300	18.6	754	4352; 272:88:68:544	68	5.5 MB	1350 (1545)	14000	118.8	367.2	11 GB	616	352-bit	23.500 (26.896)	11.750 (13.448)	0.367 (0.421)	10	78	107.6	250 W	2-way
GeForce RTX 2080 Ti	Sep 27, 2018	1199	TU102-300A	18.6	754	4352; 272:88:68:544	68	5.5 MB	1350 (1545)	14000	118.8	367.2	11 GB	616	352-bit	23.500 (26.896)	11.750 (13.448)	0.367 (0.421)	10	78	107.6	250 W	2-way
Nvidia Titan RTX	Dec 18, 2018	2499	TU102-400	18.6	754	4608; 288:96:72:576	72	6 MB	1350 (1770)	14000	129.6	388.8	24 GB	672	384-bit	24.884 (32.625)	12.442 (16.312)	0.389 (0.510)	11	84	130.5	280 W	2-way

=== Laptop ===
- Only the RTX 2050 is using the Ampere GA107 die, which is manufactured using Samsung‘s 8N process.

Model	Launch	Code name(s)	Transistors (billion)	Die size (mm^{2})	Core config	SM count	L2 cache	Clock speeds		Fillrate		Memory			Processing power (TFLOPS)			Ray tracing performance		TDP
Model	Launch	Code name(s)	Transistors (billion)	Die size (mm^{2})	Core config	SM count	L2 cache	Core (MHz)	Memory (MT/s)	Pixel (GP/s)	Texture (GT/s)	Size	Bandwidth (GB/s)	Bus width	Half precision (boost)	Single precision (boost)	Double precision (boost)	Rays/s (billions)	RTX-OPS (trillions)	TDP
GeForce RTX 2050	Dec 17, 2021	GA107 (GN20-S7)	8.7	200	2048; 64:32:32:256	16	2 MB	1155 (1477)	14000	47.26	94.53	4 GB	112	64-bit	(12.10)	(6.050)	(0.189)	?	?	30–45 W
GeForce RTX 2060 Max-Q	Jan 29, 2019	TU106 (N18E-G1)	10.8	445	1920; 120:48:30:240	30	3 MB	975 (1175)	11000	56.88	142.2	6 GB	264	192-bit	(9.101)	(4.550)	(0.142)			65 W
GeForce RTX 2060	Jan 29, 2019	TU106 (N18E-G1)	10.8	445	1920; 120:48:30:240	30	3 MB	960 (1200)	14000	57.60	144.0	6 GB	336	192-bit	(9.216)	(4.608)	(0.144)	3.5	26	80–90 W
GeForce RTX 2060	Apr 2, 2020	TU106 (N18E-G1-B)	10.8	445	1920; 120:48:30:240	30	3 MB	960 (1200)	14000	57.60	144.0	6 GB	336	192-bit	(9.216)	(4.608)	(0.144)	3.5	26	115 W
GeForce RTX 2070 Max-Q	Jan 29, 2019	TU106 (N18E-G2)	10.8	445	2304; 144:64:36:288	36	4 MB	885 (1185)	12000	75.84	170.6	8 GB	384	256-bit	(10.92)	(5.460)	(0.171)	4	31	80 W
GeForce RTX 2070	Jan 29, 2019	TU106 (N18E-G2)	10.8	445	2304; 144:64:36:288	36	4 MB	1215 (1440)	14000	92.16	207.4	8 GB	448	256-bit	(13.27)	(6.636)	(0.207)	5	38	115 W
GeForce RTX 2070	Apr 2, 2020	TU106 (N18E-G1R)	10.8	445	2304; 144:64:36:288	36	4 MB	1305 (1485)	14000	92.16	207.4	8 GB	448	256-bit	(13.27)	(6.636)	(0.207)	5	38	115 W
GeForce RTX 2070 Super Max-Q	Apr 2, 2020	TU104 (N18E-G2R)	13.6	545	2560; 160:64:40:320	40	4 MB	930 (1155)	12000	69.1	172.8	8 GB	352	256-bit	(11.06)	(5.530)	(0.173)	4	34	80 W
GeForce RTX 2070 Super	Apr 2, 2020	TU104 (N18E-G2R)	13.6	545	2560; 160:64:40:320	40	4 MB	1140 (1380)	14000	88.3	220.8	8 GB	448	256-bit	(14.13)	(7.066)	(0.221)	5	40	115 W
GeForce RTX 2080 Max-Q	Jan 29, 2019	TU104 (N18E-G3)	13.6	545	2944; 184:64:46:368	46	4 MB	735 (1095)	12000	70.08	201.5	8 GB	384	256-bit	(12.89)	(6.447)	(0.202)	5	37	80 W
GeForce RTX 2080	Jan 29, 2019	TU104 (N18E-G3)	13.6	545	2944; 184:64:46:368	46	4 MB	1380 (1590)	14000	101.8	292.6	8 GB	448	256-bit	(18.72)	(9.362)	(0.293)	7	53	150+ W
GeForce RTX 2080 Super Max-Q	Apr 2, 2020	TU104 (N18E-G3R)	13.6	545	3072; 192:64:48:384	48	4 MB	735 (1080)	11000	69.1	207.4	8 GB	352	256-bit	(13.27)	(6.636)	(0.207)	5	38	80 W
GeForce RTX 2080 Super	Apr 2, 2020	TU104 (N18E-G3R)	13.6	545	3072; 192:64:48:384	48	4 MB	1365 (1560)	14000	99.8	299.5	8 GB	448	256-bit	(19.17)	(9.585)	(0.300)	7	55	150+ W

== Reintroduction ==
Due to production problems surrounding the RTX 30-series cards and a general shortage of graphics cards due to production issues caused by the COVID-19 pandemic, which led to a global semiconductor shortage, and general demand for graphics cards increasing due to an increase in cryptocurrency mining, the RTX 2060 and its Super counterpart, alongside the GTX 1050 Ti, were brought back into production in 2021.

Furthermore, the RTX 2060 was reissued on December 7, 2021 as a variant with 12GB of VRAM. However, availability of the card at launch was scarce.

== Support ==
Nvidia transitioned driver support for the Windows 7 operating system to legacy status and stopped issuing new security drivers for this operating system in September 2024.

== See also ==
- GeForce 10 series
- GeForce GTX 16 series
- GeForce RTX 30 series
- GeForce RTX 40 series
- GeForce RTX 50 series
- Nvidia Quadro
- Nvidia Tesla
- List of Nvidia graphics processing units
