= Thomson Video Networks =

French technology broadcast company

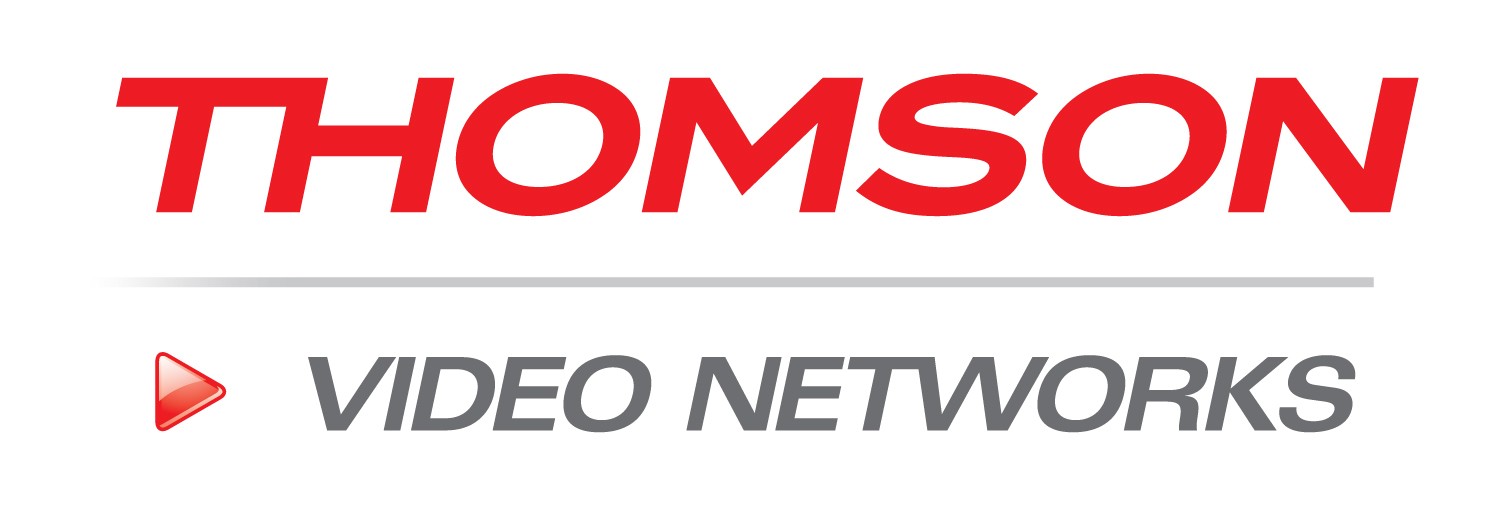
- Thomson Video Networks Logo
- Company type: Private
- Industry: ICT - Broadcast and Media
- Headquarters: Rennes, France
- Products: Video encoding and transcoding, contribution codec, video streaming, stream processing, video servers, QoS & network management system
- Number of employees: 400 (approx)
- Website: www.thomson-networks.com

Thomson Video Networks (TVN) was a technology broadcast company that used to provide video compression, transcoding and processing services to media companies, video service providers, and TV broadcasters. The firm had offices in 16 countries and headquarters in Rennes, France. TVN was acquired by Harmonic Inc. in 2016.

== History ==
The company had been established in the video delivery domain since the late 1980s when the Motion Picture Experts Group (MPEG) was created with the purpose of deriving a standard for the coding of moving pictures and audio. As a video headend division of the French electronics Thomson group, now known as Technicolor SA, the company developed and manufactured MPEG-2 and MPEG-4/AVC video encoding and networking equipment based on advanced compression algorithms. From 2011 until 2016, the division was an independent private held company with a financial structure backed by the public/private Venture Capital, FCDE.

Its products include High Definition (HD) / Standard Definition (SD) broadcast and multi-screen video encoding, decoding, transcoding, multiplexing, redundancy and network management, as well as video stream server for contribution, terrestrial, satellite, cable, IPTV, and OTT services.

The firm participated in the development and definition of the High Efficiency Video Coding (HEVC) compression standard. The HEVC standard aims at obtaining a bit-rate reduction of up to 50 percent compared to the current H.264 compression format, and paves the way for broadcasting in the Ultra high definition television (Ultra HD) picture format. The firm is a member of broadcasting associations such as ATSC, MPEG-DASH Industry Forum, DVB, IABM, MPEG, OMA, SCTE, SMPTE, as well as a founding member of the French Research Institute B-Com.

As of March 2016 Thomson Video Networks has been acquired by Harmonic Inc.

== Products ==
- ViBE EM series of HD/SD MPEG-2/MPEG-4 AVC Broadcast Encoder
- ViBE VS7000 Multi-screen & HEVC Encoder & Transcoder
- ViBE CP6000 Contribution Encoder & Decoder
- NetProcessor Video Processing & Multiplexing Platform
- Sapphire Channel In A Box MPEG Stream Server
- Amethyst IP/ASI Redundancy Switch
- XMS Network Management System
