= GeForce 10 series =

Series of GPUs by Nvidia

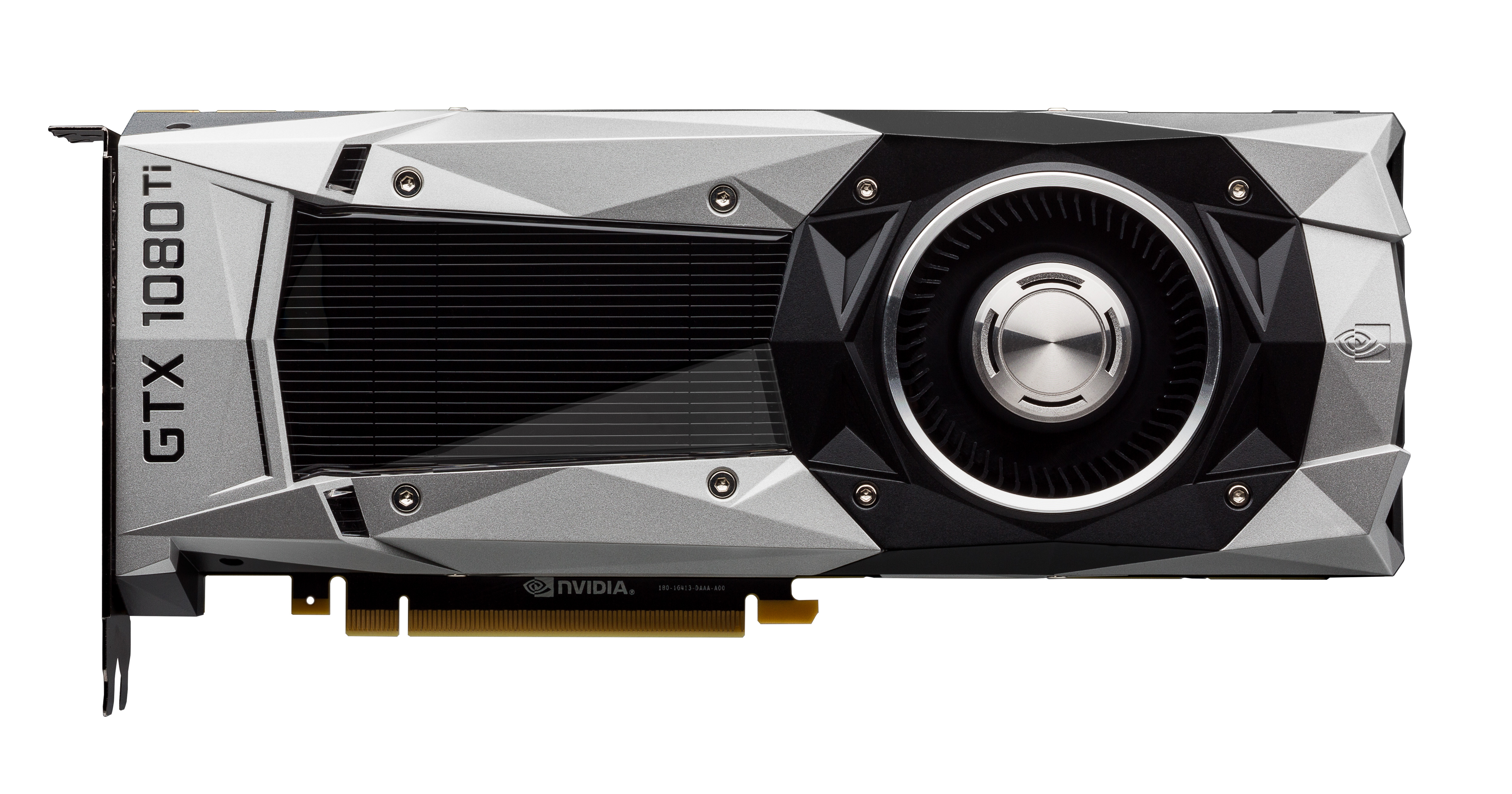
- Top: Logo of the series Bottom: A GeForce GTX 1080 Ti Founders Edition released in 2017, the series' highest-end non-Titan model
- Release date: May 17, 2016; 10 years ago
- Manufactured by: TSMC; Samsung
- Designed by: Nvidia
- Marketed by: Nvidia
- Codename: GP10x
- Architecture: Pascal
- Models: GeForce GTX series
- Transistors: 1.8B (GP108) 14 nm; 3.3B (GP107) 14 nm; 4.4B (GP106) 16 nm; 7.2B (GP104) 16 nm; 12B (GP102) 16 nm
- Fabrication process: TSMC 16 nm (FinFET); Samsung 14 nm (FinFET)

Cards
- Entry-level: GeForce GT 1010; GeForce GT 1030
- Mid-range: GeForce GTX 1050; GeForce GTX 1050 Ti; GeForce GTX 1060
- High-end: GeForce GTX 1070; GeForce GTX 1070 Ti; GeForce GTX 1080
- Enthusiast: GeForce GTX 1080 Ti; Nvidia Titan X (Pascal); Nvidia Titan Xp

API support
- OpenCL: OpenCL 3.0 (Note: In OpenCL 3.0, OpenCL 1.2 functionality has become a mandatory baseline, while all OpenCL 2.x and OpenCL 3.0 features were made optional.)
- OpenGL: OpenGL 4.6
- Vulkan: Vulkan 1.4; SPIR-V 1.4
- DirectX: Direct3D 12.0 (feature level 12_1); Shader Model 6.7

History
- Predecessor: GeForce 900 series
- Successor: GeForce GTX 16 series; GeForce RTX 20 series

Support status
- Game-ready Driver support ended in November 2025. Security updates until October 2028.

The GeForce 10 series is a series of graphics processing units (GPUs) developed by Nvidia, initially based on the Pascal microarchitecture announced in March 2014. It succeeds the GeForce 900 series, and was released in May 2016.

== Architecture ==
The Pascal microarchitecture, named after Blaise Pascal, was announced in March 2014 as a successor to the Maxwell microarchitecture. The first graphics cards from the series, the GeForce GTX 1080 and 1070, were announced on May 6, 2016, and were released several weeks later on May 27 and June 10, respectively. The architecture incorporates either 16 nm FinFET (TSMC) or 14 nm FinFET (Samsung) technologies. Initially, chips were only produced in TSMC's 16 nm process, but later chips were made with Samsung's newer 14 nm process (GP107, GP108).

New Features in GP10x:

- CUDA Compute Capability 6.0 (GP100 only), 6.1 (GP102, GP104, GP106, GP107, GP108)
- DisplayPort 1.4 (No DSC)
- HDMI 2.0b
- Fourth generation Delta Color Compression
- PureVideo Feature Set H hardware video decoding HEVC Main10 (10 bit), Main12 (12 bit) & VP9 hardware decoding (GM200 & GM204 did not support HEVC Main10/Main12 & VP9 hardware decoding)
- HDCP 2.2 support for 4K DRM protected content playback & streaming (Maxwell GM200 & GM204 lack HDCP 2.2 support, GM206 supports HDCP 2.2)
- NVENC HEVC Main10 10 bit hardware encoding (except GP108 which doesn't support NVENC)
- GPU Boost 3.0
- Simultaneous Multi-Projection
- HB SLI Bridge Technology
- New memory controller with GDDR5X & GDDR5 support (GP102, GP104, GP106)
- Dynamic load balancing scheduling system. This allows the scheduler to dynamically adjust the amount of the GPU assigned to multiple tasks, ensuring that the GPU remains saturated with work except when there is no more work that can safely be distributed. Nvidia therefore has safely enabled asynchronous compute in Pascal's driver.
- Instruction-level preemption. In graphics tasks, the driver restricts this to pixel-level preemption because pixel tasks typically finish quickly and the overhead costs of doing pixel-level preemption are much lower than performing instruction-level preemption. Compute tasks get either thread-level or instruction-level preemption. Instruction-level preemption is useful because compute tasks can take long times to finish and there are no guarantees on when a compute task finishes, so the driver enables the very expensive instruction-level preemption for these tasks.
- Triple buffering implemented in the driver level. Nvidia calls this "Fast Sync". This has the GPU maintain three frame buffers per monitor. This results in the GPU continuously rendering frames, and the most recently completely rendered frame is sent to a monitor each time it needs one. This removes the initial delay that double buffering with vsync causes, thereby preventing tearing. The costs are that more memory is consumed for the buffers and that the GPU will consume power drawing frames that might be wasted because two or more frames could possibly be drawn between the time a monitor is sent a frame and the time the same monitor needs to be sent another frame. In this case, the latest frame is picked, causing frames drawn after the previously displayed frame but before the frame that is picked to be completely wasted. This feature has been backported to Maxwell-based GPUs in driver version 372.70.

Nvidia has announced that the Pascal GP100 GPU will feature four High Bandwidth Memory stacks, allowing a total of 16 GB HBM2 on the highest-end models, 16 nm technology, Unified Memory and NVLink.

Starting with Windows 10 version 2004, support has been added for using a hardware graphics scheduler to reduce latency and improve performance, which requires a driver level of WDDM 2.7.

== Products ==
=== Founders Edition ===
Announcing the GeForce 10 series products, Nvidia introduced Founders Edition graphics card versions of the GTX 1060, 1070, 1070 Ti, 1080 and 1080 Ti. These are what were previously known as reference cards, i.e. which were designed and built by Nvidia and not by its authorized board partners. These cards were used as reference to measure performance of partner cards. The Founders Edition cards have a die cast machine-finished aluminum body with a single radial fan and a vapor chamber cooling (1070 Ti, 1080, 1080 Ti only), an upgraded power supply and a new low profile backplate (1070, 1070 Ti, 1080, 1080 Ti only). Nvidia also released a limited supply of Founders Edition cards for the GTX 1060 that were only available directly from Nvidia's website. Founders Edition cards prices (with the exception of the GTX 1070 Ti and 1080 Ti) are greater than MSRP of partners cards; however, some partners' cards, incorporating a complex design, with liquid or hybrid cooling may cost more than Founders Edition.

=== GeForce 10 (10xx) series for desktops ===
- Supported display standards are: DP 1.3/1.4, HDMI 2.0b, dual link DVI (Note: The Nvidia Titan Xp & the Founders Edition GTX 1080 Ti does not have a dual link DVI port, but a DisplayPort to single link DVI adapter is included in the box.)
- Supported APIs are: Direct3D 12 (feature level 12_1), OpenGL 4.6, OpenCL 3.0 and Vulkan 1.3

Model	Launch	Code name(s)	Fab (nm)	Transistors (billion)	Die size (mm^{2})	Bus interface	Core config (Note: Shader Processors: Texture mapping units: Render output units)	SM count (Note: The number of streaming multiprocessors on the GPU.)	L2 cache (KB)	Clock speeds (Note: GTX 1060 and GTX 1080 cards shipped after April 2017 feature increased memory speeds, thus increasing memory bandwidth.)			Fillrate (Note: Pixel fillrate is calculated as the lowest of three numbers: number of ROPs multiplied by the base core clock speed, number of rasterizers multiplied by the number of fragments they can generate per rasterizer multiplied by the base core clock speed, and the number of streaming multiprocessors multiplied by the number of fragments per clock that they can output multiplied by the base clock rate.) (Note: Texture fillrate is calculated as the number of TMUs multiplied by the base core clock speed.)		Memory				Processing power (GFLOPS) (Note: For calculating the processing power, see the Performance subsection of the Pascal architecture article.)			TDP (watts)	SLI HB support (Note: SLI HB only supports a maximum of 2-way SLI using SLI HB bridges, however if using traditional SLI bridges it can support a maximum of 4-way SLI but the performance is mostly improved in synthetic benchmarks only.)	Launch MSRP (USD)	
Model	Launch	Code name(s)	Fab (nm)	Transistors (billion)	Die size (mm^{2})	Bus interface	Core config	SM count	L2 cache (KB)	Base core clock (MHz)	Boost core clock (MHz)	Memory (MT/s)	Pixel (GP/s)	Texture (GT/s)	Size (GB)	Bandwidth (GB/s)	Type	Bus width (bit)	Single precision (boost)	Double precision (boost)	Half precision (boost)	TDP (watts)	SLI HB support	Standard	Founders Edition
GeForce GT 1010 (DDR4) (Note: Lacks hardware video encoder)	Jun 7, 2022	GP108-200-A1	14	1.8	74	PCIe 3.0 ×4	256:16:16	2	256	1151	1379	2100	18.42	18.42	2	16.8	DDR4	64	589.3 (706.1)	24.56 (29.42)	—N/a	20	No	?	—N/a
GeForce GT 1010	Jan 13, 2021	GP108-200-A1	14	1.8	74	PCIe 3.0 ×4	256:16:16	2	256	1228	1468	5000	23.49	23.49	2	40.1	GDDR5	64	629 (752)	26.2 (31.3)	—N/a	30	No	70	—N/a
GeForce GT 1030 (DDR4)	Mar 12, 2018	GP108-310-A1	14	1.8	74	PCIe 3.0 ×4	384:24:16	3	512	1151	1379	2100	18.41	27.6	2	16.8	DDR4	64	883 (1059)	27 (33)	13 (16)	20	No	80	—N/a
GeForce GT 1030	May 17, 2017	GP108-300-A1	14	1.8	74	PCIe 3.0 ×4	384:24:16	3	512	1227	1468	6000	19.6	29.4	2	48	GDDR5	64	942 (1127)	29 (35)	15 (18)	30	No	80	—N/a
GeForce GTX 1050 (2GB)	Oct 25, 2016	GP107-300-A1	14	3.3	132	PCIe 3.0 ×16	640:40:32	5	1024	1354	1455	7000	43.3	54.2	2	112	GDDR5	128	1733 (1862)	54 (58)	27 (29)	75	No	109	—N/a
GeForce GTX 1050 (3GB)	May 21, 2018	GP107-301-A1	14	3.3	132	PCIe 3.0 ×16	768:48:24	6	768	1392	1518	7000	33.4	66.8	3	84	GDDR5	96	2138 (2332)	66 (72)	33 (36)	75	No	?	—N/a
GeForce GTX 1050 Ti	Oct 25, 2016	GP107-400-A1	14	3.3	132	PCIe 3.0 ×16	768:48:32	6	1024	1290	1392	7000	41.3	61.9	4	112	GDDR5	128	1981 (2138)	62 (67)	31 (33)	75	No	139	—N/a
GeForce GTX 1060 (3GB)	Aug 18, 2016	GP106-300-A1	16	4.4	200	PCIe 3.0 ×16	1152:72:48	9	1536	1506	1708	8000	72.3	108.4	3	192	GDDR5	192	3470 (3935)	108 (123)	54 (61)	120	No	199	—N/a
GeForce GTX 1060 (5GB)	Dec 26, 2017 (Only available in China)	GP106-350-K3-A1	16	4.4	200	PCIe 3.0 ×16	1280:80:40	10	1280	1506	1708	8000	60.2	120.5	5	160	GDDR5	160	3855 (4372)	120 (137)	60 (68)	120	No	OEM	—N/a
GeForce GTX 1060	Jul 19, 2016	GP106-400-A1; GP106-410-A1	16	4.4	200	PCIe 3.0 ×16	1280:80:48	10	1536	1506	1708	8000; 9000	72.3	120.5	6	192; 216	GDDR5	192	3855 (4372)	120 (137)	60 (68)	120	No	249	299
GeForce GTX 1060 (GDDR5X)	Oct 18, 2018	GP104-150-KA-A1	16	7.2	314	PCIe 3.0 ×16	1280:80:48	10	1536	1506	1708	8000	72.3	120.5	6	192	GDDR5X	192	3855 (4372)	120 (137)	60 (68)	120	No	—N/a	—N/a
GeForce GTX 1070	Jun 10, 2016	GP104-200-A1	16	7.2	314	PCIe 3.0 ×16	1920:120:64	15	2048	1506	1683	8000	96.4 (Note: The GTX 1070 has one of the four GPCs disabled in the die. Losing one of the Raster Engines only allows for the use of 48 ROPs per cycle.)	180.7	8	256	GDDR5	256	5783 (6463)	181 (202)	90 (101)	150	2-way SLI HB or 2/3/4-way SLI	379	449
GeForce GTX 1070 Ti	Nov 2, 2017	GP104-300-A1	16	7.2	314	PCIe 3.0 ×16	2432:152:64	19	2048	1607	1683	8000	102.8	244.3	8	256	GDDR5	256	7816 (8186)	244 (256)	122 (128)	180	2-way SLI HB or 2/3/4-way SLI	449	449
GeForce GTX 1080	May 27, 2016	GP104-400-A1; GP104-410-A1	16	7.2	314	PCIe 3.0 ×16	2560:160:64	20	2048	1607	1733	10000; 11000	102.8	257.1	8	320; 352	GDDR5X	256	8228 (8873)	257 (277)	128 (139)	180	2-way SLI HB or 2/3/4-way SLI	599	699
GeForce GTX 1080 Ti	Mar 10, 2017	GP102-350-K1-A1	16	12	471	PCIe 3.0 ×16	3584:224:88	28	2816	1480	1582	11000	130.2	331.5	11	484	GDDR5X	352	10609 (11340)	332 (354)	166 (177)	250	2-way SLI HB or 2/3/4-way SLI	699	699
Nvidia Titan X	Aug 2, 2016	GP102-400-A1	16	12	471	PCIe 3.0 ×16	3584:224:96	28	3072	1417	1531	10000	136	317.4	12	480	GDDR5X	384	10157 (10974)	317 (343)	159 (171)	250	2-way SLI HB or 2/3/4-way SLI	—N/a	1200
Nvidia Titan Xp	Apr 6, 2017	GP102-450-A1	16	12	471	PCIe 3.0 ×16	3840:240:96	30	3072	1405	1582	11410	135	337.2	12	547.7	GDDR5X	384	10790 (12150)	337 (380)	169 (190)	250	2-way SLI HB or 2/3/4-way SLI	—N/a	1200

=== GeForce 10 (10xx) series for notebooks ===
The biggest highlight to this line of notebook GPUs is the implementation of configured specifications close to (for the GTX 1060–1080) and exceeding (for the GTX 1050/1050 Ti) that of their desktop counterparts, as opposed to having "cut-down" specifications in previous generations. As a result, the "M" suffix is completely removed from the model's naming schemes, denoting these notebook GPUs to possess similar performance to those made for desktop PCs, including the ability to overclock their core frequencies by the user, something not possible with previous generations of notebook GPUs. This was made possible by having lower Thermal Design Power (TDP) ratings as compared to their desktop equivalents, making these desktop-level GPUs thermally feasible to be implemented into OEM notebook chassis with improved thermal dissipation designs, and, as such, are only available through the OEMs. In addition, the entire line of GTX Notebook GPUs also are available in lower-TDP and quieter variations called the "Max-Q Design", specifically made for ultra-thin gaming systems in conjunction with OEM Partners that incorporate enhanced heat dissipation mechanisms with lower operating noise volumes, which are also made available as an additional more powerful option to existing gaming notebooks as well, which was launched on 27 June 2017.

In addition, the GT series line of Notebook GPUs is no longer introduced starting from this generation, replaced by the MX series of Notebook GPUs. Only the MX150 is based on Pascal's GP108 die used on the GT1030 for Desktops, with higher clock frequencies compared to its Desktop counterpart, while the other chips in the MX series were re-branded versions of the previous generation GPUs (MX130 is a re-branded GT940MX GPU while MX110 is a re-branded GT920MX GPU).

- Supported APIs are: Direct3D 12 (feature level 12_1 or 11_0 on MX110 and MX130), OpenGL 4.6, OpenCL 3.0 and Vulkan 1.3
- Only GTX 1070 and GTX 1080 have SLI support.

Model	Launch	Code name(s)	Fab (nm)	Transistors (billion)	Die size (mm^{2})	Bus interface	Core config (Note: Shader Processors: Texture mapping units: Render output units)	SM Count (Note: The number of streaming multiprocessors on the GPU.)	L2 cache (MB)	Clock speeds			Fillrate (Note: Pixel fillrate is calculated as the lowest of three numbers: number of ROPs multiplied by the base core clock speed, number of rasterizers multiplied by the number of fragments they can generate per rasterizer multiplied by the base core clock speed, and the number of streaming multiprocessors multiplied by the number of fragments per clock that they can output multiplied by the base clock rate.) (Note: Texture fillrate is calculated as the number of TMUs multiplied by the base core clock speed.)		Memory				Processing power (GFLOPS) (Note: For calculating the processing power, see the Performance subsection of the Pascal architecture article.)			TDP (watts)
Model	Launch	Code name(s)	Fab (nm)	Transistors (billion)	Die size (mm^{2})	Bus interface	Core config	SM Count	L2 cache (MB)	Base core clock (MHz)	Boost core clock (MHz)	Memory (MT/s)	Pixel (GP/s)	Texture (GT/s)	Size (GB)	Bandwidth (GB/s)	Type	Bus width (bit)	Single precision (Boost)	Double precision (Boost)	Half precision (Boost)	TDP (watts)
GeForce MX110 (Note: Lacks hardware video encoder and decoder)	Nov 17, 2017	GM108 (N16V-GMR1)	28	?	?	PCIe 3.0 ×4	384:24:8	3	1.0	965	993	1800 (DDR3); 5000 (GDDR5)	7.944	23.83	2	14.4 (DDR3); 40.1 (GDDR5)	DDR3; GDDR5	64	741.1 (762.6)	23.16 (23.83)	—N/a	30
GeForce MX130	Nov 17, 2017	GM108 (N16S-GTR)	28	?	?	PCIe 3.0 ×4	384:24:8	3	1.0	1122	1242	1800 (DDR3); 5000 (GDDR5)	9.936	29.81	2	14.4 (DDR3); 40.1 (GDDR5)	DDR3; GDDR5	64	861.7 (953.9)	26.93 (29.81)	—N/a	30
GeForce MX150	May 17, 2017	GP108 (N17S-LG)	14	1.8	74	PCIe 3.0 ×4	384:24:16	3	0.5	937	1038	5000	14.99	22.49	2; 4	40.1	GDDR5	64	719.6 (797.2)	22.49 (24.91)	11.24 (12.45)	10
GeForce MX150	May 17, 2017	GP108 (N17S-G1)	14	1.8	74	PCIe 3.0 ×4	384:24:16	3	0.5	1468	1532	6000	23.49	35.23	2; 4	48	GDDR5	64	1127 (1177)	35.23 (36.77)	17.62 (18.38)	25
GeForce GTX 1050 Max-Q (Notebook)	Jan 3, 2018	GP107 (N17P-G0)	14	3.3	132	PCIe 3.0 ×16	640:40:16	5	1.0	999–1189	1139–1328	7000	19.02	47.56	2; 4	112	GDDR5	128	1278–1521 (1457–1699)	39.96–47.56 (45.56–53.12)	19.98–23.78 (22.78–26.56)	34-40
GeForce GTX 1050 (Notebook)	Jan 3, 2017	GP107 (N17P-G0)	14	3.3	132	PCIe 3.0 ×16	640:40:16	5	1.0	1354	1493	7000	21.66	54.16	2; 4	112	GDDR5	128	1733 (1911)	54.16 (59.72)	27.08 (29.86)	53
GeForce GTX 1050 Ti Max-Q (Notebook)	Jan 3, 2018	GP107 (N17P-G1)	14	3.3	132	PCIe 3.0 ×16	768:48:32	6	1.0	1151–1290	1290–1417	7000	41.28	61.92	4	112	GDDR5	128	1767–1981 (1981–2176)	55.24–61.92 (61.92–68.02)	27.62–30.96 (30.96–34.01)	40-46
GeForce GTX 1050 Ti (Notebook)	Jan 3, 2017	GP107 (N17P-G1)	14	3.3	132	PCIe 3.0 ×16	768:48:32	6	1.0	1493	1620	7000	47.78	71.66	4	112	GDDR5	128	2293 (2488)	71.66 (77.76)	35.83 (38.88)	64
GeForce GTX 1060 Max-Q (Notebook)	Jun 27, 2017	GP106 (N17E-G1)	16	4.4	200	PCIe 3.0 ×16	1280:80:48	10	1.5	1063–1265	1341–1480	8000	60.72	101.2	3; 6	192	GDDR5	192	2721–3238 (3432–3788)	85.04–101.2 (107.3–118.4)	42.52–50.60 (53.64–59.20)	60-70
GeForce GTX 1060 (Notebook)	Aug 16, 2016	GP106 (N17E-G1)	16	4.4	200	PCIe 3.0 ×16	1280:80:48	10	1.5	1404	1670	8000	67.39	112.3	3; 6	192	GDDR5	192	3594 (4275)	112.3 (133.6)	56.16 (66.80)	80
GeForce GTX 1070 Max-Q (Notebook)	Jun 27, 2017	GP104 (N17E-G2)	16	7.2	314	PCIe 3.0 ×16	2048:128:64	16	2.0	1101–1215	1265–1379	8000	77.76	155.5	8	256	GDDR5	256	4509–4977 (5181–5648)	140.9–155.5 (161.9–176.5)	70.46–77.76 (80.96–88.26)	80-90
GeForce GTX 1070 (Notebook)	Aug 16, 2016	GP104 (N17E-G2)	16	7.2	314	PCIe 3.0 ×16	2048:128:64	16	2.0	1442	1645	8000	92.29	184.6	8	256	GDDR5	256	5906 (6738)	184.6 (210.6)	92.29 (105.3)	115
GeForce GTX 1080 Max-Q (Notebook)	Jun 27, 2017	GP104 (N17E-G3)	16	7.2	314	PCIe 3.0 ×16	2560:160:64	20	2.0	1101–1290	1278–1458	10000	82.56	206.4	8	320	GDDR5X	256	5637–6605 (6543–7465)	176.2–206.4 (204.5–233.3)	88.08–103.2 (102.2–116.6)	90-110
GeForce GTX 1080 (Notebook)	Aug 16, 2016	GP104 (N17E-G3)	16	7.2	314	PCIe 3.0 ×16	2560:160:64	20	2.0	1556	1733	10000	99.58	249.0	8	320	GDDR5X	256	7967 (8873)	249.0 (277.3)	124.5 (138.6)	150

== Reintroduction ==
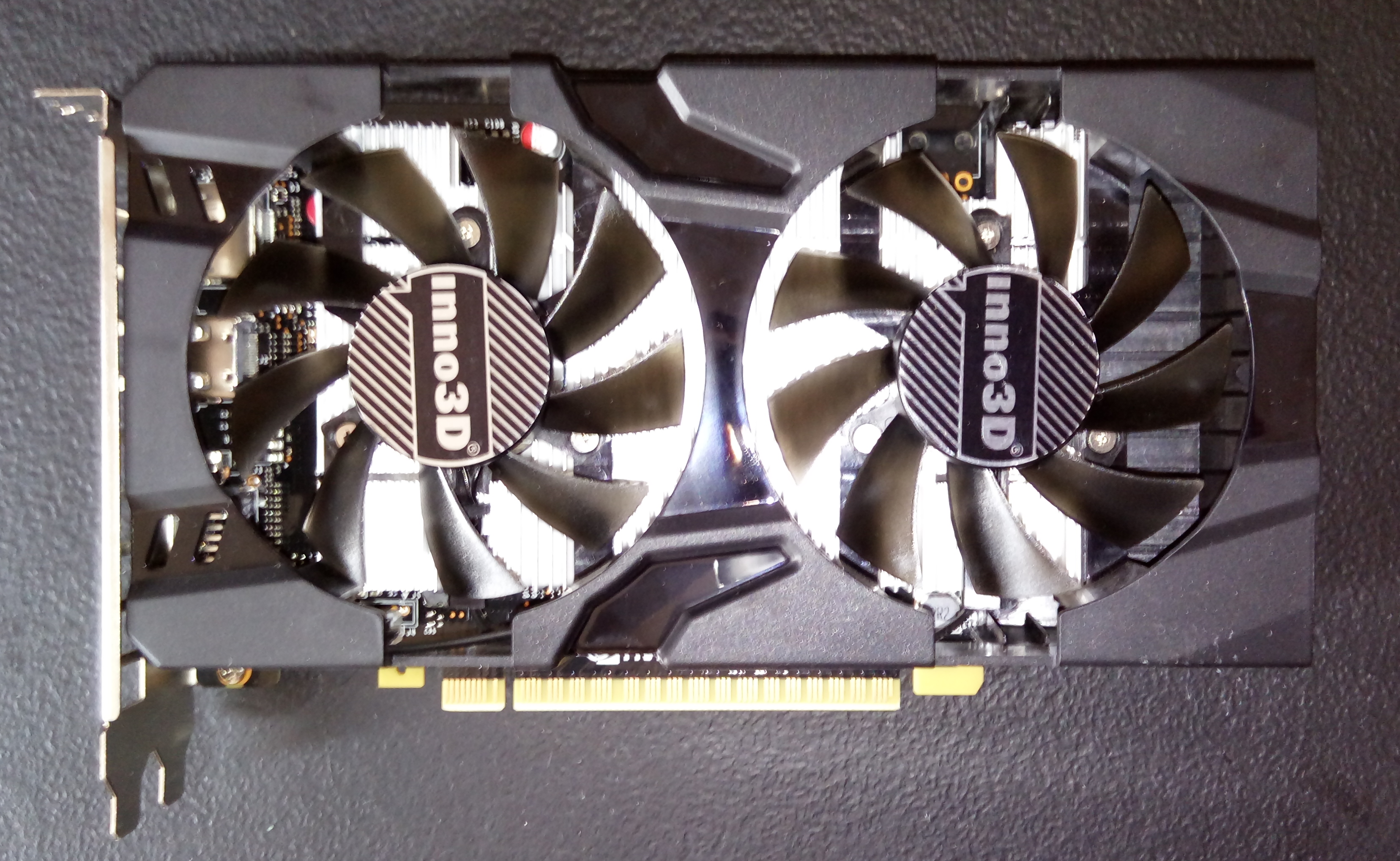
An Inno3D GeForce GTX 1050 Twin X2

Due to production problems surrounding the RTX 30-series cards and a general shortage of graphics cards due to production issues caused by the COVID-19 pandemic, which led to a global shortage of semiconductor chips, and general demand for graphics cards increasing due to an increase in cryptocurrency mining, the GTX 1050 Ti, alongside the RTX 2060 and its Super counterpart, was brought back into production in 2021.

In addition, Nvidia quietly released the GeForce GT 1010 in January 2021.

== Support ==
Nvidia stopped releasing 32-bit drivers for 32-bit operating systems after driver version 391.35 in March 2018.

Nvidia transitioned driver support for the Windows 7 and Windows 8.1 operating systems to legacy status and stopped issuing new security drivers for these operating systems in September 2024. The GeForce 10 series is the last Nvidia GPU generation to support 32-bit operating systems; beginning with the Turing architecture, newer Nvidia GPUs now require a 64-bit operating system. It is also the last Nvidia GPU generation to officially support the Windows 8 and Windows 8.1 operating system.

In December 2025, Nvidia discontinued Game Ready Driver support for the Maxwell, Pascal, and Volta architectures, which includes the GeForce 10 series. Security updates are scheduled to be continued until October 2028, as per Nvidia. On July 1, 2025, Nvidia announced that driver branch 580 will be the last to support these architectures.

== See also ==
- GeForce RTX 30 series
- GeForce RTX 40 series
- GeForce RTX 50 series
- Nvidia Quadro
- Nvidia Tesla
- Pascal (microarchitecture)
- List of Nvidia graphics processing units
