= Video random-access memory =

Type of dedicated computer memory

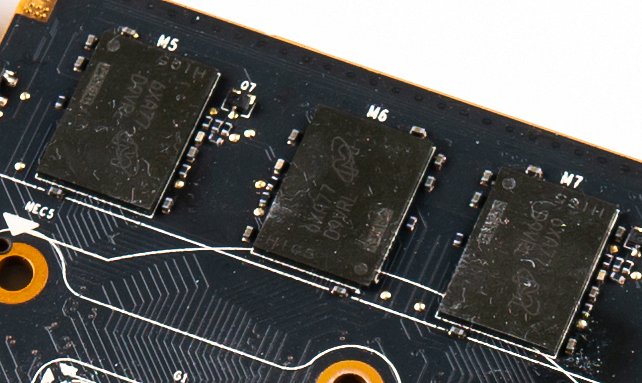
GDDR5X SDRAM on an NVIDIA GeForce GTX 1080 Ti graphics card

Video random-access memory (VRAM) is dedicated computer memory used to store the pixels and other graphics data as a framebuffer to be rendered on a computer monitor. It often uses a different technology than other computer memory, in order to be read quickly for display on a screen.

== Relation to GPUs ==
Independent system RAM and video RAM

Unified memory

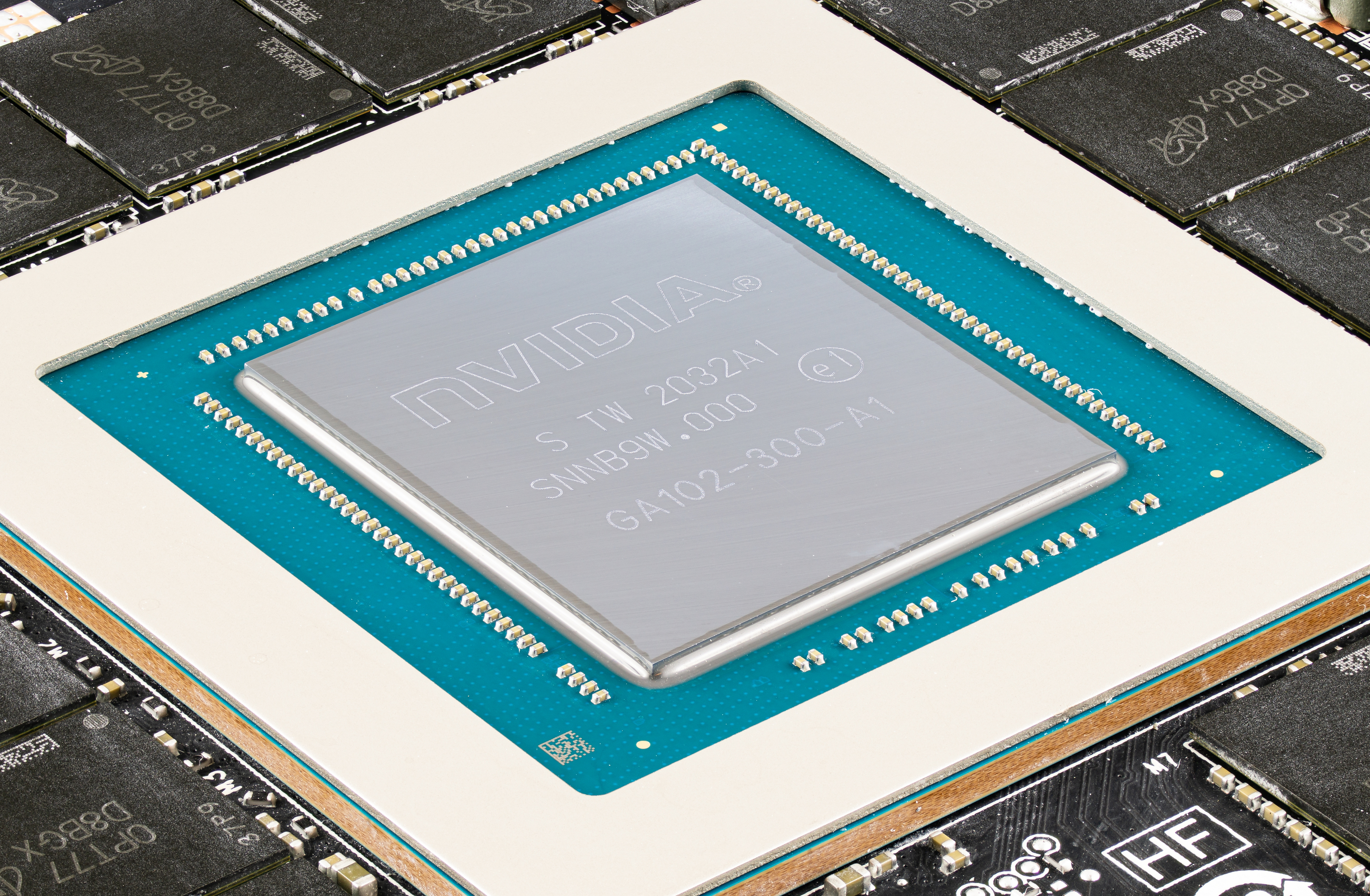
A GPU die surrounded by VRAM chips

Many modern GPUs rely on VRAM. In contrast, a GPU that does not use VRAM, and relies instead on system RAM, is said to have a unified memory architecture, or shared graphics memory.

System RAM and VRAM have been segregated due to the bandwidth requirements of GPUs, and to achieve lower latency, since VRAM is physically closer to the GPU die.

Modern VRAM is typically found in a BGA package soldered onto a graphics card. The VRAM is cooled along with the GPU by the GPU heatsink.

== Technologies ==
- Dual-ported video RAM, used in the 1990s and at the time often called VRAM
- SGRAM
- GDDR SDRAM
- High Bandwidth Memory (HBM)

== See also ==
- Graphics processing unit
- Tiled rendering, a method to reduce VRAM bandwidth requirements
