= ASUS ProArt =

ASUS product line

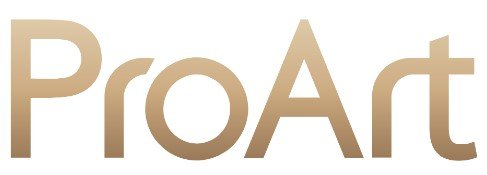
- Developer: ASUS
- Released: 2011
- Marketing target: Creative professionals and content creators
- Related: ASUS ROG – gaming-oriented line; ASUS VivoBook Pro – creator-oriented consumer laptops; ASUS ExpertBook – business-oriented line; ASUS ZenBook Pro – premium ultrabook line with creative focus
- Website: www.asus.com/proart/

ProArt is a product line introduced by ASUS in 2011, targeting the professional content creation market. ASUS offers a range of hardware under the ProArt brand, such as laptops, desktop computers, displays, motherboards, graphics cards, cooling solutions, chassis, and accessories. The ProArt series caters to professionals in creative fields like photography, graphic design, film and video editing, animation and game design, broadcasting, product design, and architecture. The product line usually features high color accuracy (e.g., specific Delta E values), high-performance computing components, and compatibility certified by ISVs with professional creative software.

== History ==
=== Early development (2011–2018) ===
ASUS launched the ProArt series in 2011 with the PA246Q, a 24-inch P-IPS (Performance-In-Plane Switching) monitor designed for content creators focusing on high color accuracy. The series saw new models, included the PQ321 in 2013 and the 32-inch quantum dot PA329Q in 2015. The line added OLED technology with the portable PQ22UC in 2018.

In 2020, ASUS released the PA32UCG, which features Mini LED backlighting, HDR-1600 certification, and a 120 Hz refresh rate. Reviewers often praised this model for its usefulness in HDR mastering and post-production.

=== Expansion into laptops and components (2019–present) ===
The ProArt brand expanded into laptops in 2019. ASUS introduced the StudioBook series, including models like the ProArt StudioBook One and the ProArt StudioBook Pro X, offering various laptops for professional creatives.

In 2023, ASUS broadened the ProArt series beyond displays and laptops to include PC components, such as motherboards, graphics cards, AiO liquid coolers, and chassis. These components are promoted for their thermal management, low noise levels, and professional designs.

At Computex 2026 in June, ASUS announced the first ProArt systems built on NVIDIA's RTX Spark platform: the ProArt P16 (H7607) and P14 (H7407) laptops, along with the ProArt Mini PC (GR1X). Coverage of the announcement described the systems as ASUS's first ProArt hardware focused on locally executed AI tasks instead of a separate graphics setup.

=== Industry collaboration ===
ASUS has partnered with third-party organizations like Adobe, Dolby, and Pantone to connect ProArt displays and computing components with professional creative workflows.

== Laptops ==
The ProArt StudioBook is a series of mobile workstations made by ASUS. It mainly targets creative professionals in areas like photography, animation, filmmaking, visual effects, game design, and architecture.

The series includes hardware configurations with NVIDIA Quadro or GeForce RTX graphics cards, ISV certification for compatibility with professional applications, and OLED displays that provide high color accuracy with specific Delta E values.

Many models in the StudioBook line meet US military-grade MIL-STD-810 durability standards. This shows their strength against certain environmental and physical stress tests.

The laptops feature physical interfaces like the ASUS Dial, a rotary controller built into the chassis, along with the ProArt Creator Hub software. This software helps users monitor system performance and customize controls for creative applications found in the Adobe Creative Cloud suite.

In recent generations, the laptops have come with AI-powered applications such as MuseTree, a tool for visual ideation and StoryCube a platform for media management. These are pre-installed on the devices.

2019: The ProArt StudioBook series debuted in 2019 at the Consumer Electronics Show (CES), aimed at creative professionals. Later that year, at IFA Berlin, ASUS expanded the lineup by launching the ProArt StudioBook One and the ProArt StudioBook Pro X. The StudioBook One was highlighted as the first laptop with NVIDIA Quadro RTX 6000 graphics. Media coverage suggested these releases created a more complete range of laptops for creators.

2021: ASUS refreshed the ProArt StudioBook series with new features including OLED displays, the ASUS Dial hardware controller, and the ProArt Creator Hub software for monitoring and customization. These models also received NVIDIA Studio validation, ensuring software compatibility and system stability across creative applications.

2023: Reviewer described the ASUS ProArt StudioBook 16 H500 as a powerful professional notebook due to its 10-bit OLED display and NVIDIA GeForce RTX 3070 graphics.

2024: ASUS launched a new generation of ProArt laptops, including the ProArt P16, PX13, and PZ13. These models include AI features tailored for content creation workflows and come with proprietary software like MuseTree and StoryCube for visual ideation and media management.

2026: The ASUS ProArt GoPro Edition (PX13) is a 13.3-inch convertible laptop created through a partnership between ASUS and GoPro. Announced at CES 2026, the laptop has a 360-degree hinge and a body built to meet military-grade durability standards. It runs on an AMD Ryzen AI Max+ processor and supports up to 128 GB of unified memory. It features a 3K Lumina OLED touchscreen display designed for color-accurate video editing. Hardware elements specific to this collaboration include dedicated GoPro hotkeys and a built-in microSD card reader. The system comes with StoryCube software for media management and is classified as a Copilot+ PC. It uses on-device artificial intelligence for tasks like scene recognition and file organization.

The ASUS ProArt PZ14 (HT7407) is a detachable 2-in-1 laptop made for mobile creative work. It has a Snapdragon X2 Elite processor and an 3K OLED touchscreen that emphasizes color accuracy. The device has an IP52 rating for dust and water resistance and meets military-grade durability standards. It also supports AI functions, including Microsoft Copilot+ features for tasks like video editing and graphic design. Included accessories are a detachable Bluetooth keyboard and a stylus.

=== Awards ===
The ProArt StudioBook 16 3D OLED earned multiple international design awards, including the iF Design Award, Red Dot Award, Good Design Award, and recognition as a finalist for the 2023 IDEA Award. These honors acknowledge its design, featuring an immersive 3D display and functions designed for creators.

The ProArt P16 received the Good Design Award 2024 for its innovative design.

== NVIDIA RTX Spark platform ==
ASUS launched three ProArt products based on NVIDIA's RTX Spark platform at Computex 2026 on June 1: the ProArt P16 (H7607) laptop, the ProArt P14 (H7407) laptop, and the ProArt Mini PC (GR1X). The platform combines a 20-core NVIDIA Grace CPU with a Blackwell-based RTX GPU that has 6,144 CUDA cores, connected by NVLink-C2C. Memory is shared between the CPU and GPU and can be configured up to 128 GB of LPDDR5X.

=== ProArt P16 and P14 ===
The P16 (H7607) and P14 (H7407) were the first ASUS laptops to feature RTX Spark silicon, both having a thickness of about half an inch and weighing less than four pounds. Each of them is equipped with an ASUS Lumina Pro OLED display having a 16:10 aspect ratio, full DCI-P3 coverage and a peak brightness of 1,600 nits, together with an anti-reflective coating. The 16-inch P16 can be set to 3840 × 2400 at 120 Hz with variable refresh rate and G-Sync support, while the 14-inch P14 is limited to 2880 × 1800. The laptops were available in two finishes, Nano Black and Neo White, a fact which The Gadgeteer noted as ASUS's first move away from the all-black-or-silver approach that had been used in previous ProArt laptops.

=== ProArt Mini PC ===
The ProArt Mini PC (GR1X) is a small desktop computer of dimensions 150 × 150 × 51 mm, featuring a cooling system rated at 140 W, 10-gigabit Ethernet, and PCIe Gen 5 expansion. It, like the laptops, can be configured with 128 GB of unified memory, a specification that ASUS has highlighted as suitable for rendering 3D scenes exceeding 90 GB and for running local language models with approximately 120 billion parameters.

== Desktops ==
The ProArt Station line includes compact and full-tower workstations built for handle high-performance computing tasks in studio settings. The series provides strong computing power, certified software compatibility, and reliable cooling.

2019: This is a compact 8L desktop featuring 9th Gen Intel Core CPUs, NVIDIA Quadro graphics, a dual-sided motherboard layout, and LED indicators designed for creative studio use.

2021: ASUS launched the ProArt Station PD5 desktop in 2021. It includes 11th Gen Intel Core CPUs, NVIDIA Quadro RTX 4000/A2000 graphics, Lumiwiz LEDs, multi-zone cooling, and ISV certification, making it suitable for creative production workflows.

2023: ASUS introduced the updated ProArt Station PD5, a full-tower desktop with 13th Gen Intel Core CPUs, NVIDIA RTX graphics, Lumiwiz status LEDs, multi-zone cooling, and ProArt Creator Hub to assist content creation workflows.

Awards: The ProArt Station PD5 has earned several international design awards, including the iF Design Award 2021, Red Dot Award 2022, and the Taiwan Excellence Award 2022.

== Graphics cards ==
The ASUS ProArt series offers graphics cards made by ASUS, aimed at professional content creators and creative professionals. These cards usually have a compact 2.5-slot design and a minimalist look, setting them apart from ASUS's gaming-oriented ROG (Republic of Gamers) and TUF Gaming series. The ProArt graphics cards focus on performance and stability for demanding tasks like video editing, 3D rendering, graphic design, and other content creation work.

2023: SUS launched its first ProArt series graphics cards: the GeForce RTX 4080 and 4070 Ti models. These models are known for their quiet operation and minimalist design, which are made for content creation workflows.

2025: ASUS announced the ProArt GeForce RTX 50 series graphics cards. These cards feature a compact 2.5-slot design, a wood-patterned look, an Aura-lit logo, and a USB Type-C port, all crafted for content creators.

Awards: The ASUS ProArt GeForce RTX 40 series graphics cards received the iF Design Award 2024 and the Red Dot Design Award 2024 for their design.

== Motherboards ==
ProArt motherboards are a line of products aimed at creators, developed by ASUS. They are designed for content professionals and support high memory capacity, multiple M.2 slots, Thunderbolt connectivity, This makes them ideal for tasks like 3D rendering, video editing, and animation.

=== 2022 ===
ProArt Z790-CREATOR WIFI : The ProArt Z790-Creator WiFi work with Intel 12th-14th Gen CPUs. It offers DDR5, PCIe 5.0, Thunderbolt 4, and various options for creators.

ProArt X670E-CREATOR WIFI : The ProArt X670E-Creator WiFi is compatible with AMD Ryzen desktop CPUs. It includes DDR5, PCIe 5.0, USB4, and options for content creators..

=== 2024 ===
ProArt Z890-CREATOR WIFI: The ProArt Z890-CREATOR WIFI is built for creator and supports Intel Core Ultra. It offers Thunderbolt 5, 10G LAN, WiFi 7, DDR5, and PCIe 5.0.

ProArt X870E-CREATOR WIFI: The ProArt X870E-Creator WiFi is compatible with AMD Ryzen 9000 Series. It features USB4, PCIe 5.0, DDR5, 10G LAN, and WiFi 7.

== Chassis ==
ProArt cases are made for creative professionals. They have features for airflow and cooling and are built to support focused workflows and versatility. The chassis has a minimalist design to reduce visual clutter in professional workspaces.

=== 2023 ===
ProArt PA602: The ProArt PA602 E-ATX computer chassis, the first chassis in the ProArt series, supports 420 mm radiators and comes with one pre-installed 140mm fan and two 200mm fans.

=== 2024 ===
ProArt PA401 Wood Edition: This ATX computer chassis features a craft wood front panel made from FCS certified materials and includes two pre-installed 160mm x 32mm front fans.

ProArt PA602 Wood Edition: This E-ATX computer chassis has a craft wood design made from FCS certified materials, supports 420 mm radiators, and includes one pre-installed 140mm fan and two 200mm fans.

=== 2025 ===
ProArt PA401: This ATX computer chassis supports 240 mm radiators and comes with two pre-installed 160mm x 32mm front fans.

Red Dot Design Award: The ProArt PA401 received the Red Dot Design Award 2025 for its design. The ProArt PA602 received the Red Dot Design Award 2024 for its design.

Good Design Award: The ProArt PA602 won the Good Design Award in 2024.

== Displays ==
ProArt Display is a line of professional monitors by ASUS that targets content creators. Since the debut of the first ProArt display, PA246Q, in 2011, the series has focused on color accuracy and performance. Each display is factory calibrated to ensure color accuracy (Delta E < 1). The series also includes color management software like ProArt Calibration, Color Center, Creator Hub, and ASUS DisplayWidget Center.

The ProArt Display series features the world's first 32-inch 4K monitor that supports Dolby Vision. This technology offers HDR visuals with industry-standard certification for cinematic color grading and video mastering.

The product line ranges from portable 14-inch models to 32-inch displays, featuring resolutions such as 4K, 5K, 6K, and 8K. ProArt monitors provide connectivity options like Thunderbolt, 12G-SDI, HDMI 2.1, and USB-C, making them easy to integrate into studio and production settings.

2011: The ProArt Display PA246Q, the first ProArt professional monitor, offers a 1920x1200 resolution with a P-IPS panel. It includes DVI, VGA, HDMI, and DisplayPort connections.

2013: The ProArt Display PQ321Q is the first IGZO 4K UHD monitor, featuring a 3840x2160 resolution. It supports multi-display setups through DisplayPort and HDMI ports.

2015: The ProArt Display PA329Q is a 32-inch 4K UHD Quantum Dot professional monitor with 100% Adobe RGB color coverage, pre-calibrated color accuracy, and various connectivity options.

2018: The ProArt Display PQ22UC is the world's first 21.6-inch portable OLED display. It boasts a 4K resolution and covers 99% of the DCI-P3 color gamut. It offers factory-calibrated color accuracy with a Delta E < 2 and supports multiple HDR formats.

2019: The ProArt Display PA32UCX is the world's first Mini LED display with Dolby Vision support. It features a 4K resolution and covers 99% of the DCI-P3 color gamut. It provides true 10-bit color depth and achieves 1200 nits peak brightness.

2020: The ProArt Display PA32UCG is the world's first display with 1600 nits brightness and a 120 Hz high refresh rate. It features a 4K resolution and MiniLED backlight, covering 98% of the DCI-P3 color gamut with a Delta E < 1. It also offers true 10-bit color depth.

2022: The ProArt Display OLED PA32DC is the world's first OLED monitor with auto calibration. It has a 4K resolution, covers 99% of the DCI-P3 color gamut with Delta E < 1 accuracy, and provides true 10-bit color depth.

2024: The ProArt Display 8K PA32KCX is the world's first 8K HDR mini LED professional monitor. It features 4032-zone mini LED backlighting, a built-in motorized colorimeter, 98% DCI-P3 coverage with Delta E < 1 accuracy, and supports Thunderbolt 4 with 96 W power delivery.

== AIO coolers ==
The ProArt AIO Cooler is a series of all-in-one (AIO) liquid coolers released in December 2023. It is aimed at content creators and designed to run quietly during demanding CPU tasks.

2023: The ProArt LC 420 works with motherboards using AMD's AM5 and Intel's LGA 1851 sockets. ASUS markets the product as delivering both strong cooling performance and quiet operation.

== Accessories ==
ProArt accessories are a range of computer peripherals from ASUS, aimed at content creators. The product line focuses on precision, durability, and improving workflow. ASUS claims that these design goals are reflected in the products' ergonomic features, control interfaces, and mobility options.

2021: ASUS launched the ProArt Mouse MD300 and MousePad PS201. The MD300 mouse has a physical dial (ASUS Dial) for software adjustments, while the PS201 mouse pad includes a magnetic docking area for accessories and a gray-card surface for color calibration.

2024: The company introduced the ProArt Backpack, made from recycled water-repellent materials. The design features an antimicrobial lining, breathable back panels, and space for laptops up to 17 inches.

2026: Asus launched the ProArt MD301, a computer mouse with an ergonomic design similar to the Razer Basilisk V2, thumb scroll wheel, 5 device switching, and 1K polling rate.
