= GeForce RTX 50 series =

Series of GPUs by Nvidia

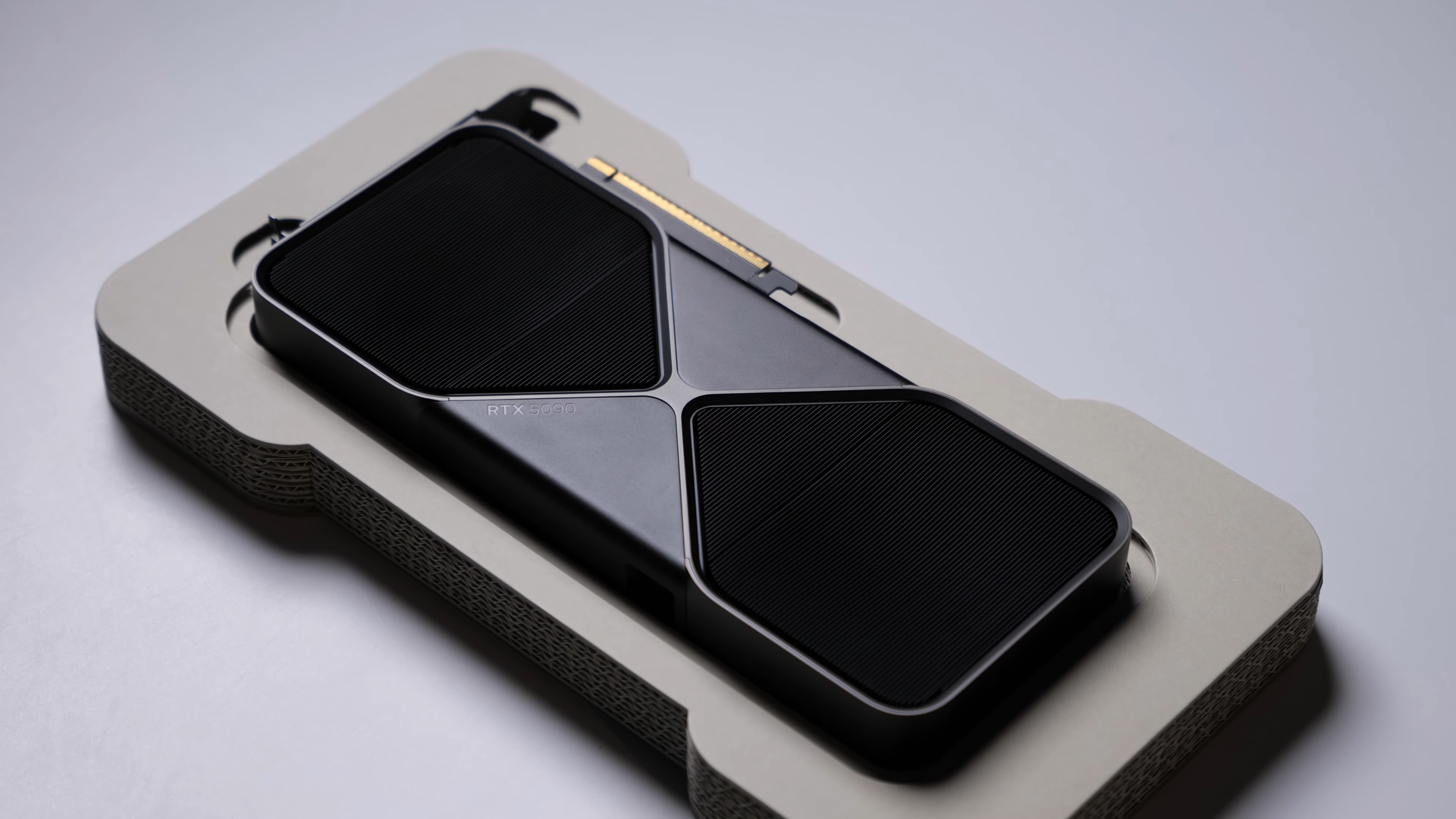
- A GeForce RTX 5090 Founders Edition released in 2025, the series' flagship model
- Release date: January 30, 2025; 21 months ago
- Manufactured by: TSMC
- Designed by: Nvidia
- Marketed by: Nvidia
- Architecture: Blackwell
- Fabrication process: TSMC 4N

Cards
- Entry-level: GeForce RTX 5050; GeForce RTX 5060
- Mid-range: GeForce RTX 5060 Ti (8GB); GeForce RTX 5060 Ti (16GB)
- High-end: GeForce RTX 5070; GeForce RTX 5070 Ti; GeForce RTX 5080
- Enthusiast: GeForce RTX 5090; GeForce RTX 5090D (Chinese market only)

API support
- Direct3D: Direct3D 12.0 Ultimate (feature level 12_2); Shader Model 6.8
- OpenCL: OpenCL 3.0 (64-bit only)
- OpenGL: OpenGL 4.6
- Vulkan: Vulkan 1.4

History
- Predecessor: GeForce RTX 40 series

Support status
- Supported

The GeForce RTX 50 series of consumer graphics cards is the successor of Nvidia's GeForce 40 series. Announced at CES 2025, it debuted with the release of the RTX 5070, RTX 5080 and RTX 5090 on January 30 2025. It is based on Nvidia's Blackwell architecture featuring Nvidia RTX's fourth-generation RT cores for hardware-accelerated real-time ray tracing, and fifth-generation deep learning–focused Tensor Cores. The GPUs are manufactured by TSMC on a custom 4N process node.

== Background ==
In March 2024, Nvidia announced the Blackwell architecture for its datacenter products. Like Ampere, the architecture is shared by consumer and data center products rather than having distinct architectures released simultaneously like Ada Lovelace for consumers and Hopper for datacenter.

At the Game Awards in December 2024, a cinematic trailer for The Witcher IV was shown that had been pre-rendered on an "unannounced Nvidia GeForce RTX GPU". This was assumed to be an upcoming GeForce RTX 50 series GPU. Following the RTX 50 series announcement, Nvidia confirmed that the trailer was "pre-rendered in Unreal Engine 5 on a GeForce RTX 5090". Later in the same month, it was reported that Nvidia had begun stockpiling GeForce RTX 50 series units in U.S. warehouses due to a threatened 10% import tariff and 60% tariff on Chinese imports that Donald Trump promised in his re-election campaign.

=== Announcement ===
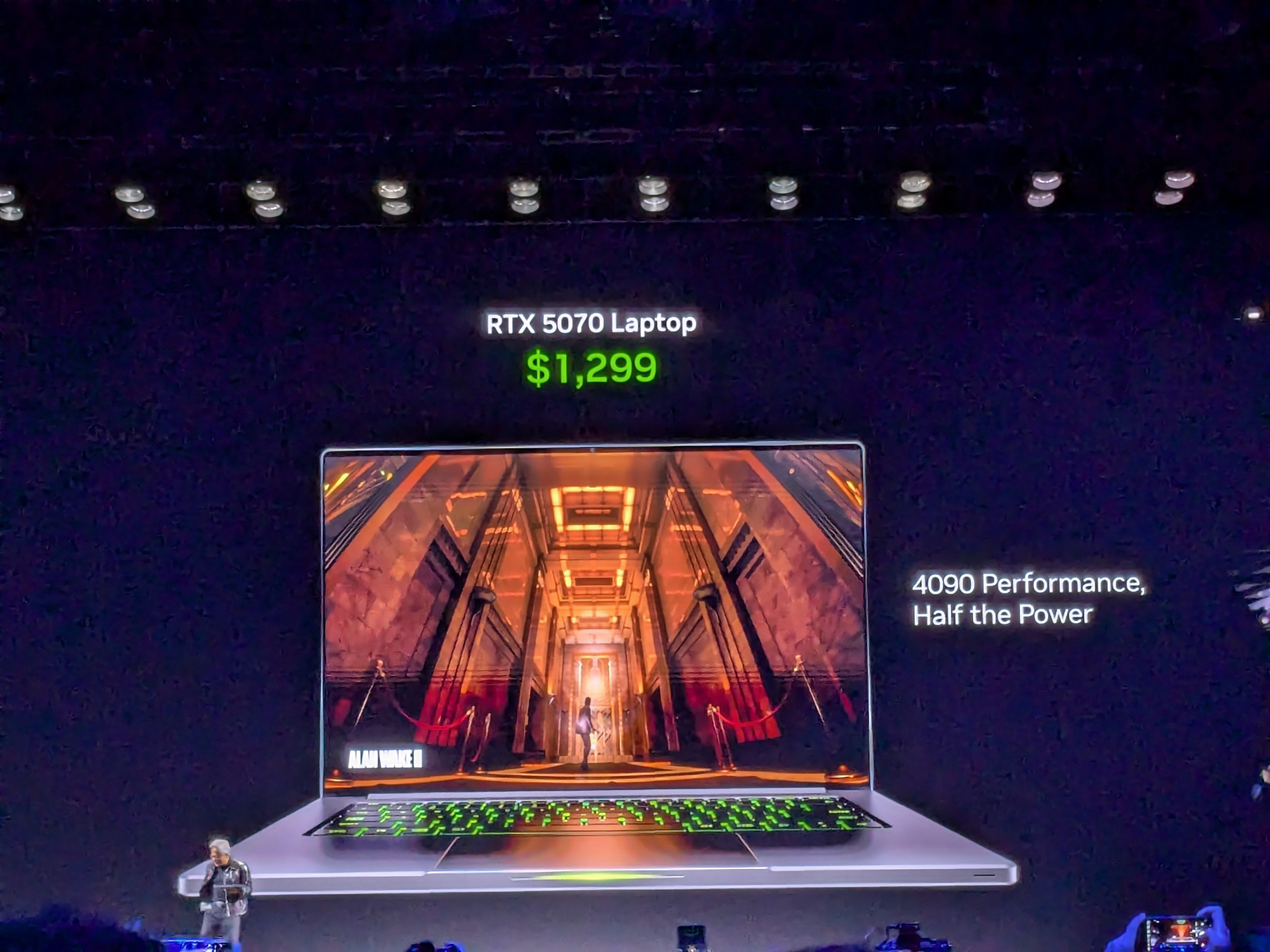
Nvidia CEO Jensen Huang presenting the RTX 5070 Laptop at CES 2025

On January 6, 2025, the GeForce RTX 50 series was officially announced for desktop and mobile devices during Nvidia's CES keynote in Las Vegas. The pricing announcement was met with surprise as the RTX 5080 at $999 was the same price that the RTX 4080 Super released at a year earlier despite the anticipated price increases. Although Nvidia CEO Jensen Huang announced that the RTX 5070 could reach "RTX 4090 performance at $549", the claim was derided as false because the figure relied on the use of DLSS 4 upscaling and Multi Frame Generation and did not accurately indicate the 5070's raw performance.

== Features ==
Summary
- Up to 21,760 CUDA cores
- Up to 32 GB of GDDR7 VRAM
- PCIe 5.0 interface
- DisplayPort 2.1b and HDMI 2.1a display connectors

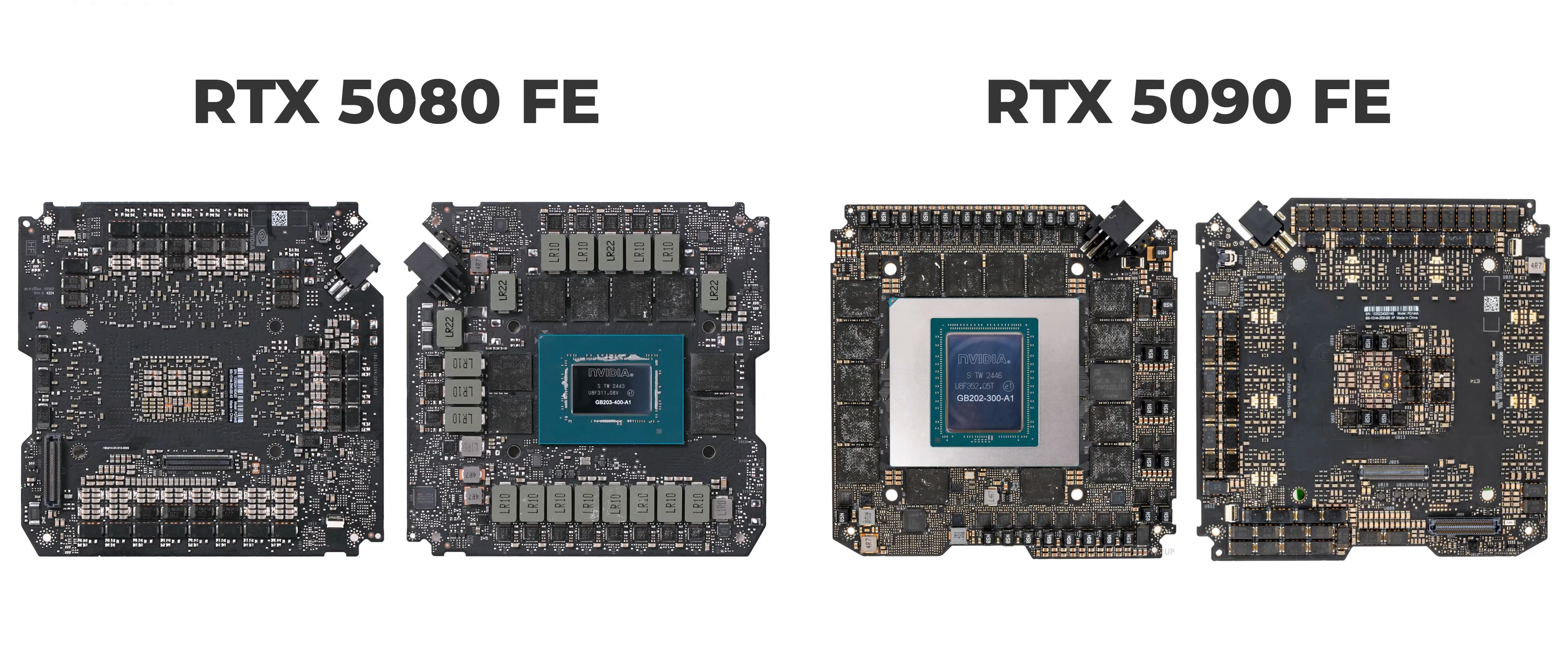
The printed circuit boards of the RTX 5080 and 5090 Founders Editions (top and bottom views)

=== Blackwell architecture ===
The GeForce RTX 50 series is powered by the Blackwell microarchitecture, which continues Ada Lovelace's emphasis on high graphics frequencies and large L2 caches. The Blackwell architecture introduces Nvidia RTX's fourth-generation RT cores for hardware-accelerated real-time ray tracing and fifth-generation Tensor Cores for AI compute and performing floating-point calculations.

=== GDDR7 ===
Bus width	Theoretical bandwidth (GB/s)		
Bus width	GDDR6X (21 Gbps)	GDDR7 (28 Gbps)	GDDR7 (32 Gbps)
192 bit	504	672	768
256 bit	672	896	1024
384 bit	1008	1344	1536
512 bit	1344	1792	2048

RTX 50 series GPUs are the first consumer GPUs to feature GDDR7 video memory for greater memory bandwidth over the same bus width compared to the GDDR6 and GDDR6X memory used in the GeForce 40 series. RTX 50 series desktop GPUs use GDDR7 modules from Samsung due to them being available for validation earlier than modules from SK Hynix and Micron.

=== 12V-2×6 connector ===
16-pin 12V-2×6 connector on a Palit GeForce RTX 5090 Gamerock

The GeForce RTX 50 series uses the 16-pin 12V-2×6 connector, which is a revision of the 12VHPWR connector featured on earlier versions of the GeForce 40 series. There were problems with the 12VHPWR connector melting on some RTX 4090 GPUs due to the connector not being fully seated and connector design flaws that did not implement a high enough safety and error tolerance. The 12V-2×6 connector revision, published by PCI-SIG in July 2023, addressed this by shortening the four sense pins so the connector will not push any power if it has not been fully seated. The 12VHPWR design would still draw up to 150W of power even if the sense pins were not making full contact. 12V-2×6 is backwards compatible with existing 12VHPWR cables and adapters.

Nvidia has mandated to its AIB partners that the 16-pin 12V-2×6 connector be used on all RTX 50 series designs. With the GeForce 40 series, the 12VHPWR connector was only mandated on higher power cards such as the RTX 4070 Super, RTX 4070 Ti, RTX 4070 Ti Super, RTX 4080, RTX 4080 Super and RTX 4090 while RTX 4060, RTX 4060 Ti and RTX 4070 AIB designs had the option of using 8-pin PCIe connectors. The 600W-capable 12VHPWR connector would not have been necessary on sub-200W cards.

=== DLSS 4 ===
	GeForce series			
	RTX 20	RTX 30	RTX 40	RTX 50
Transformer Model	Yes	Yes	Yes	Yes
2× Frame Generation	No	No	Yes	Yes
3−6× Frame Generation	No	No	No	Yes

The fourth generation of Deep Learning Super Sampling (DLSS) was unveiled alongside the RTX 50 series. DLSS 4 upscaling uses a new vision transformer-based model for enhanced image quality with reduced ghosting and greater image stability in motion compared to the previous convolutional neural network (CNN) model. DLSS 4 also allows a greater number of frames to be generated and interpolated based on a single traditionally rendered frame. This form of frame generation called Multi Frame Generation is exclusive to the RTX 50 series while the GeForce 40 series is limited to one interpolated frame per traditionally rendered frame. Nvidia claims that DLSS 4's frame generation model uses 30% less video memory with the example of Warhammer 40,000: Darktide using 400 MB less memory at 4K resolution with frame generation enabled. Nvidia claims that 75 titles will integrate DLSS 4 Multi Frame Generation at launch, including Alan Wake 2, Cyberpunk 2077, Indiana Jones and the Great Circle, and Star Wars Outlaws.

=== Media Engine and I/O ===
	NVENC encoders (9th gen.)	NVDEC decoders (6th gen.)
RTX 5050 RTX 5060 RTX 5060 Ti RTX 5070	1	1
RTX 5070 Ti	2	1
RTX 5080	2	2
RTX 5090	3	2

The RTX 50 series includes DisplayPort 2.1b UHBR20 (80Gbps) with higher display output data rates to support high resolution and high refresh rate displays. The GeForce 40 series received criticism for only including DisplayPort 1.4a (32Gbps) while the competing Radeon RX 7000 series included DisplayPort 2.1 UHBR13.5 (54Gbps). At CES 2025, VESA announced a collaboration with Nvidia on the new DP80LL ("low loss") UHBR20 active cable standard. DP80LL allows for 80Gbps DisplayPort 2.1 cables up to 3 meters long as passive DP80 cables are limited in length due to signal integrity concerns.

The RTX 50 series introduces the ninth-generation NVENC encoder and sixth-generation NVDEC video decoder. For the first time in a consumer GeForce GPU, encoding and decoding video in the 4:2:2 color format for professional-grade higher color depth is supported.

=== DLSS 4.5 ===
Nvidia introduced DLSS 4.5 in January 2026, adding a second-generation Transformer model for DLSS Super Resolution, which improves temporal stability, anti-aliasing and image clarity. The update also introduced Dynamic Multi Frame Generation and a 6× Multi Frame Generation mode, capable of generating up to five additional frames for every traditionally rendered frame. DLSS 4.5 Super Resolution is available on all GeForce RTX GPUs, while Dynamic Multi Frame Generation and 6× Multi Frame Generation are exclusive to the RTX 50 series.

=== DLSS 5 ===
Nvidia introduced DLSS 5 in March 2026, with availability beginning on 3 September 2026. It introduces 3D-Guided Neural Rendering, which uses a specialized AI model to enhance lighting and material details in real time while using the game engine's rendered frame, geometry, textures and lighting data as a foundation. Nvidia designed the technology to preserve developers' artistic intent while producing more realistic lighting, materials and other visual effects. DLSS 5 is exclusive to GeForce RTX 50 series GPUs and debuted in NBA 2K27 and on GeForce Now; an unofficial mod enables DLSS 5 support on otherwise-incompatible hardware such as those from RTX 20, 30 and 40 series GPUs.

== List of GPUs ==
=== Desktop ===
GeForce RTX 50 series desktop GPUs are the second consumer GPUs to utilize a PCIe 5.0 interface and the first to feature GDDR7 video memory (except for the entry level RTX 5050 that still uses GDDR6). They are fabricated by TSMC using a custom 5 nm process dubbed 4N.

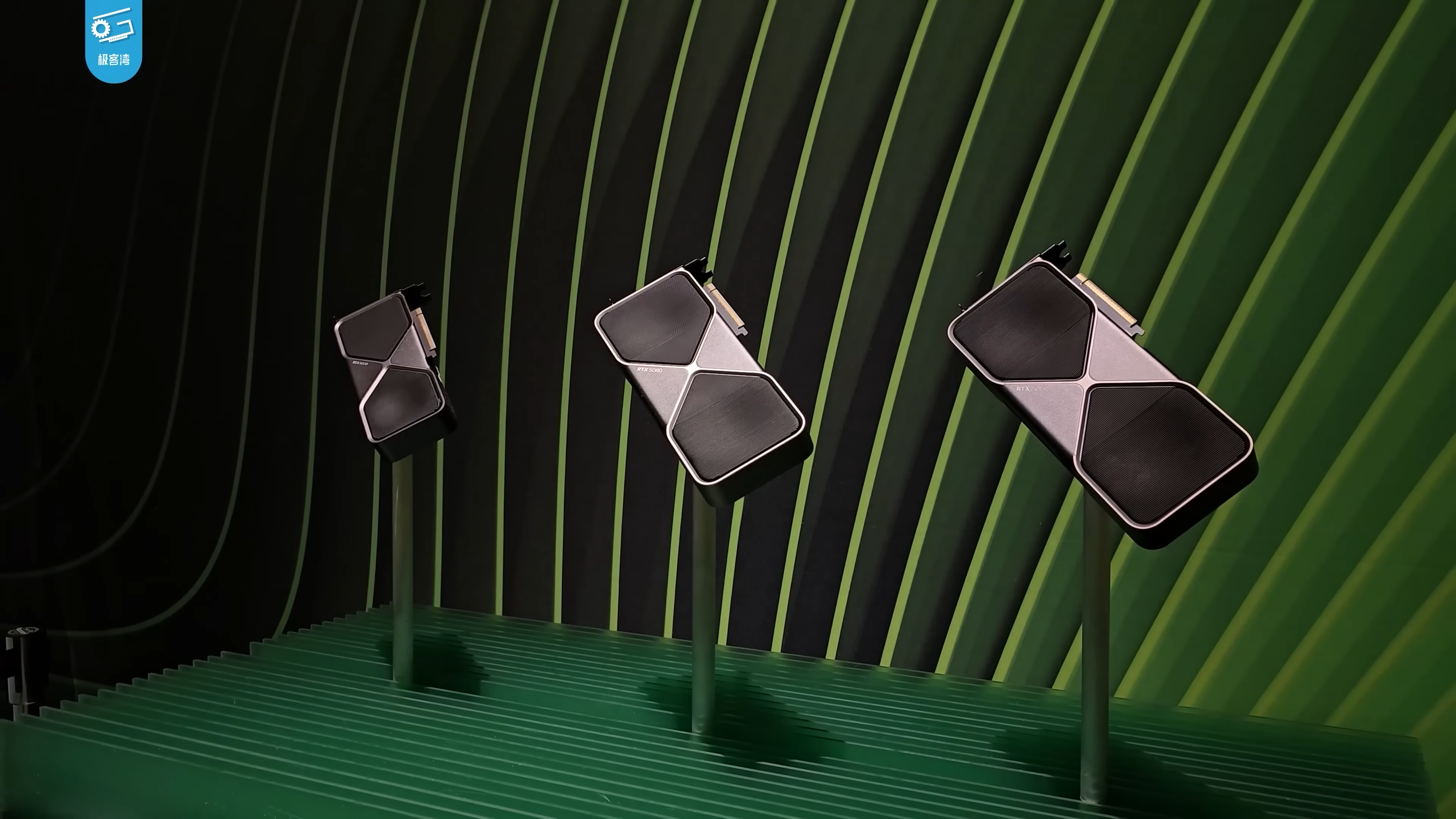
From left to right: GeForce RTX 5070, 5080 and 5090 Founders Editions at CES 2025

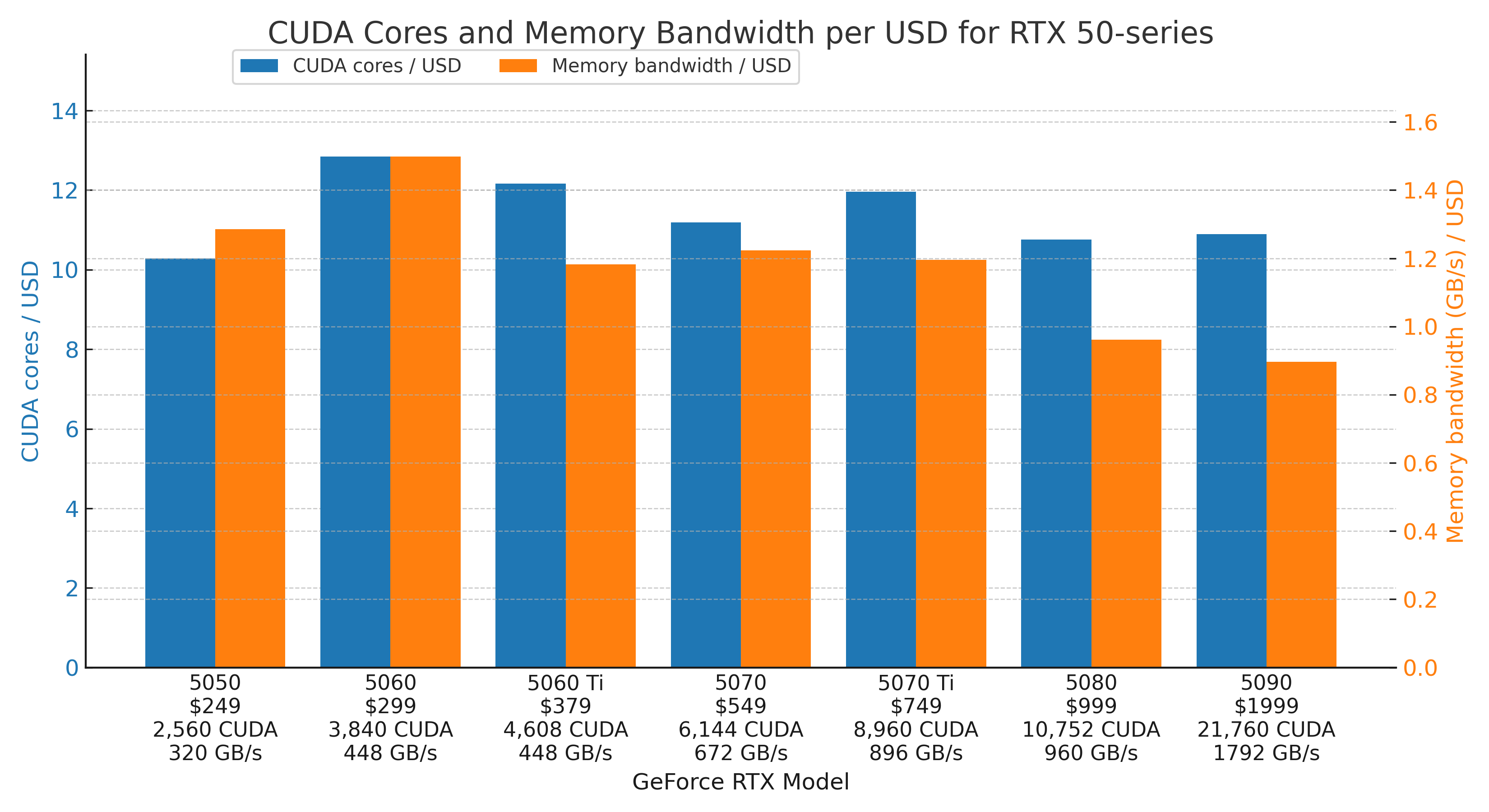
CUDA cores and memory bandwidth per USD for RTX 50-series GPUs

GeForce RTX		5050	5060	5060 Ti	5070	5070 Ti	5080	5090
Release date		1 Jul 2025	19 May 2025	16 Apr 2025	5 Mar 2025	20 Feb 2025	30 Jan 2025	
Launch MSRP (USD)		249	299	379 (8 GB); 429 (16 GB)	549	749	999	1,999
GPU die		GB207-300	GB206-250	GB206-300	GB205-300	GB203-300	GB203-400	GB202-300
Transistors (billion)		16.9	21.9		31.1	45.6		92.2
Die size		149 mm^{2}	181 mm^{2}		263 mm^{2}	378 mm^{2}		750 mm^{2}
Core	CUDA cores	2,560	3,840	4,608	6,144	8,960	10,752	21,760
Core	Texture mapping unit	80	120	144	192	280	336	680
Core	Render output unit	32	48		80	96	112	176
Core	Ray tracing cores	20	30	36	48	70	84	170
Core	Tensor cores	80	120	144	192	280	336	680
Core	Clock speed (GHz) Boost value (GHz)	2.31; 2.57	2.28; 2.50	2.41; 2.57	2.16; 2.51	2.30; 2.45	2.30; 2.62	2.01; 2.41
Streaming multiprocessors		20	30	36	48	70	84	170
Cache	L1	2.5 MB	3.75 MB	4.5 MB	6 MB	8.75 MB	10.5 MB	21.25 MB
Cache	L2	24 MB		32 MB	48 MB		64 MB	96 MB
Memory	Type	GDDR6	GDDR7					
Memory	Size	8 GB		8 GB; 16 GB	12 GB	16 GB		32 GB
Memory	Clock (Gb/s)	20	28				30	28
Memory	Bandwidth (GB/s)	320	448		672	896	960	1792
Memory	Bus width	128-bit			192-bit	256-bit		512-bit
Fillrate	Pixel (Gpx/s) (Note: Pixel fillrate is calculated as the number of render output units (ROPs) multiplied by the base (or boost) core clock speed.)	82.3	119.9	123.5	201.0	235.4	293.1	423.6
Fillrate	Texture (Gtex/s) (Note: Texture fillrate is calculated as the number of texture mapping units (TMUs) multiplied by the base (or boost) core clock speed.)	205.8	299.6	370.4	482.3	686.6	879.3	1637
Pro- cessing Power (TFLOPS)	FP16/FP32 (Note: Processing power is calculated as the number of CUDA cores multiplied by 2 (for one fused multiply-add (FMA) operation) times the boost core clock speed.)	13.2	19.2	23.7	30.9	43.9	56.3	104.8
Pro- cessing Power (TFLOPS)	FP64	0.21	0.30	0.37	0.48	0.69	0.88	1.64
Pro- cessing Power (TFLOPS)	Ray tracing	40	58	72	93.6	133.2	170.6	317.5
Pro- cessing Power (TFLOPS)	Tensor compute [sparse] (Note: Tensor compute is based on GPU Boost Clock at specific tensor precisions (Peak FP8 Tensor TFLOPS with FP32 Accumulate & Peak FP16 Tensor TFLOPS with FP16 Accumulate.)	52.6 [105.3]	76.8 [153.5]	94.9 [189.8]	123.5 [246.9]	177.4 [354.8]	225.1 [450.2]	419.2 [838.4]
Interface	Host	PCIe 5.0 x8			PCIe 5.0 x16			
Interface	Power	1× 8-pin			1× 12V-2x6			
Interface	Displays	1× HDMI 2.1b and 3× DisplayPort 2.1b						
TDP		130 W	145 W	180 W	250 W	300 W	360 W	575 W

=== Mobile ===
Laptops featuring GeForce RTX 50 series laptop GPUs were shown at CES 2025. Laptops with RTX 50 series GPUs were paired with Intel's Arrow Lake-HX and AMD's Strix Point and Fire Range CPUs. Nvidia claims that Blackwell architecture's new Max-Q features can increase battery life by up to 40% over GeForce 40 series laptops. For example, Advanced Power Gating saves power by turning off areas of the GPU that are unused and the paired GDDR7 memory can run in an "ultra" low-voltage state. Initial RTX 50 series laptops were made available in March 2025 starting at $1,299.

GeForce RTX		5050 Laptop	5060 Laptop	5070 Laptop	5070 Ti Laptop	5080 Laptop	5090 Laptop
Release date		Jun 2025	May 2025	Apr 2025	Mar 2025		
GPU die		GB207-300	GB206-200	GB206-300	GB205-200	GB203-250	GB203-400
Transistors (billion)		16.9	21.9		31.1	45.6	
Die size		149 mm^{2}	181 mm^{2}		263 mm^{2}	378 mm^{2}	
Core	CUDA cores	2,560	3,328	4,608	5,888	7,680	10,496
Core	Texture mapping unit	80	104	144	184	240	328
Core	Render output unit	32	48		80	96	112
Core	Ray tracing cores	20	26	36	46	60	82
Core	Tensor cores	80	104	144	184	240	328
Core	Clock speed (GHz) Boost value (GHz)	1.02–2.31; 1.50–2.55	0.95–1.95; 1.45–2.31	0.90–1.83; 1.42–2.21	0.85–1.98; 1.45–2.47	0.98–1.80; 1.50–2.28	0.99–2.28; 1.51–2.52
Streaming multiprocessors		20	26	36	46	60	82
Cache	L1	2.5 MB	3.25 MB	4.5 MB	5.75 MB	7.5 MB	10.5 MB
Cache	L2	32 MB			48 MB	64 MB	
Memory	Type	GDDR7					
Memory	Size	8 GB		8 GB; 12 GB	12 GB	16 GB	24 GB
Memory	Clock (Gb/s)	24			28		
Memory	Bandwidth (GB/s)	384			672	896	
Memory	Bus width	128-bit			192-bit	256-bit	
Fillrate	Pixel (Gpx/s) (Note: Pixel fillrate is calculated as the number of render output units (ROPs) multiplied by the base (or boost) core clock speed.)	48.0–81.6	69.8–110.9	68.4–106.2	115.8–198.0	144–219.5	169.7–282.2
Fillrate	Texture (Gtex/s) (Note: Texture fillrate is calculated as the number of texture mapping units (TMUs) multiplied by the base (or boost) core clock speed.)	120.0–204.0	151.3–240.2	205.2–318.5	266.2–455.4	360–548.8	496.9–826.5
Processing power (TFLOPS)	FP16/FP32	7.68–13.05	9.68–15.38	13.13–20.39	17.04–29.14	23.04–35.13	31.80–52.90
Processing power (TFLOPS)	FP64	0.12–0.20	0.15–0.24	0.20–0.32	0.27–0.45	0.36–0.54	0.49–0.82
Processing power (TFLOPS)	Tensor compute [sparse]						
Interface	Host	PCIe 5.0 x16					
TDP		50–100 W	45–100 W	50–100 W	60–115 W	80–150 W	95–150 W

== Controversies ==
=== 12V-2x6 power connector issue ===
The 12V-2x6 connector used by multiple 5090 cards faces criticism due to a design flaw that can potentially cause the connector to melt. The flaw affects Nvidia's own RTX 5090 FE and RTX 5080 FE cards and are similar to the failures seen on the RTX 40 series. Models by add-in board partners have been affected as well.

=== Availability and pricing ===
The releases of the RTX 5090, 5080 and 5070 Ti were marked by severe availability issues and pricing well above MSRP. Pricing became an issue again at the end of 2025 due to an ongoing memory supply shortage. Nvidia has been rumored to cut production of 16GB VRAM cards, affecting the availability of the RTX 5060 Ti 16GB and RTX 5070 Ti SKUs.

Starting in October 10, 2026, rumors that the RTX 5090 was being discontinued and that future GB202 dies which are used to make RTX 5090s were being diverted to server and workstation products were reported on by multiple outlets. Shortly after those rumors became popular, Micro Center, a major technology retailer in the United States, quit carrying RTX 5090s. Nvidia then removed the RTX 5090 from its own online store. PC Games Hardware reported that video card manufacturers were getting their last allocations of RTX 5090s. Nvidia denied the rumor and claimed that RTX 5090s are not discontinued, but a Tom's Hardware article about the denial found the denial to be not credible.

On October 30, 2026, the RTX 5080 was removed from Nvidia's marketplace web page. On November 14, 2026, the RTX 5080 16GB supply was restored.

On November 15, 2026, RTX 5090s were found to be restocked at Newegg, but at prices that were triple of the MSRP.

=== 32-bit support removal for CUDA, OpenCL, and GPU PhysX ===
Support for 32-bit CUDA and as a result 32-bit GPU-accelerated PhysX and 32-bit OpenCL were dropped for the GeForce RTX 50 series, which resulted in several applications encountering performance issues with GPU PhysX options or not being able to run at all, causing negative reactions from numerous gaming communities.

On December 4, 2025, with the release of driver version 591.44, 32-bit GPU-accelerated PhysX support was restored for certain games. Support for more games was promised in the future.

=== Incomplete dies and missing ROPs ===
The dies of certain RTX 5090/5090D, 5080, and 5070 Ti cards were missing eight render output units (ROPs), resulting in slower graphics while pure compute and AI workloads are unaffected. Nvidia claimed that less than 0.5% of cards are affected and that the "production anomaly" has been rectified.

=== Black screen issues ===
Some RTX 5080 and 5090 users reported an issue where the system would boot into a black screen after installing Nvidia drivers. Nvidia confirmed the issue and said that a new driver update would fix it for people who hadn't received a VBIOS update yet. Released on February 27, 2025 Nvidia drivers version 572.60 claim to have fixed the issue. Nvidia has since released multiple hotfix and Game Ready drivers that contain additional fixes for the issue.

=== Windows driver branch quality and stability ===
Users and media outlets have complained about the quality and stability of the 572.XX and 576.XX Windows driver branch (that was released for the RTX 50 series), also affecting previous generation Nvidia GPUs, including RTX 30 and RTX 40 series. Issues include BSODs, graphical corruptions and game specific problems.

=== RTX 5060 Ti 8GB and RTX 5060 review restrictions ===
Nvidia decided not to supply reviewers with advance copies of RTX 5060 Ti 8GB cards and prevented certain partners from doing so. It also delayed reviews of the RTX 5060 as the review embargo was lifted on April 16, 2025, before reviewers could acquire the cards officially. Nvidia chose not to offer samples of the RTX 5050.

=== DLSS 4 Multi Frame Generation (MFG) criticism ===
Several technology journalists have been critical of Nvidia's performance claims relating to GeForce RTX 50 graphics cards, as Nvidia published benchmarks using MFG to show significant increases in FPS over their previous generation. Additional concerns were uttered about image quality, the increase in input latency and general usability.

Nvidia claims that the RTX 5070 is as fast as the RTX 4090, but this is untrue except the extreme scenario of 4x DLSS 4 Multi Frame generation and the lowest quality DLSS preset. This combination results in noticeable visual artifacts that are exacerbated if the base frame rate is too low; this is said to be between 40 and 60 fps by several reviewers. Additionally, while it may improve perceived frame rate through frame smoothing, it increases input latency and is thus unsuitable for latency-sensitive games such as competitive shooters, fighting games and virtual reality games.

Nvidia also claims that the RTX 5060 Ti is up to 50 times faster than the GTX 1060, a GPU released 9 years prior and with a significantly lower MSRP than the 5060 Ti. These performance claims appear to be based on the 1060's lack of support for hardware ray tracing, DLSS Super Sampling, and Multi Frame Generation; as such, they are of little relevance when evaluating the gaming performance of the 5060 Ti.

=== DLSS 5 criticism ===
DLSS 5 received criticism over its use of generative AI, with some observers arguing that it could alter developers' intended visual style and produce unnatural-looking details. Nvidia's demonstrations were also criticized for the technology's performance cost, with Nvidia stating that DLSS 5 can reduce frame rates by 50–60%. DLSS 5 increases power consumption, with early tests showing that an MSI Lightning Z RTX 5090 (a card which has 2 12V-2x6 connectors to allow it to consume over 600 watts) up to 802 watts in one early test, and other RTX 5090 cards slowing down while using less power. At least one user reports that a 12V-2x6 connector on an MSI GeForce RTX 5090 Gaming Trio OC was discovered to be melted and burned after testing DLSS 5 with NBA 2K27 which was the only game that officially supports DLSS 5 at the time of the test.

== Reception ==
=== RTX 5090 ===
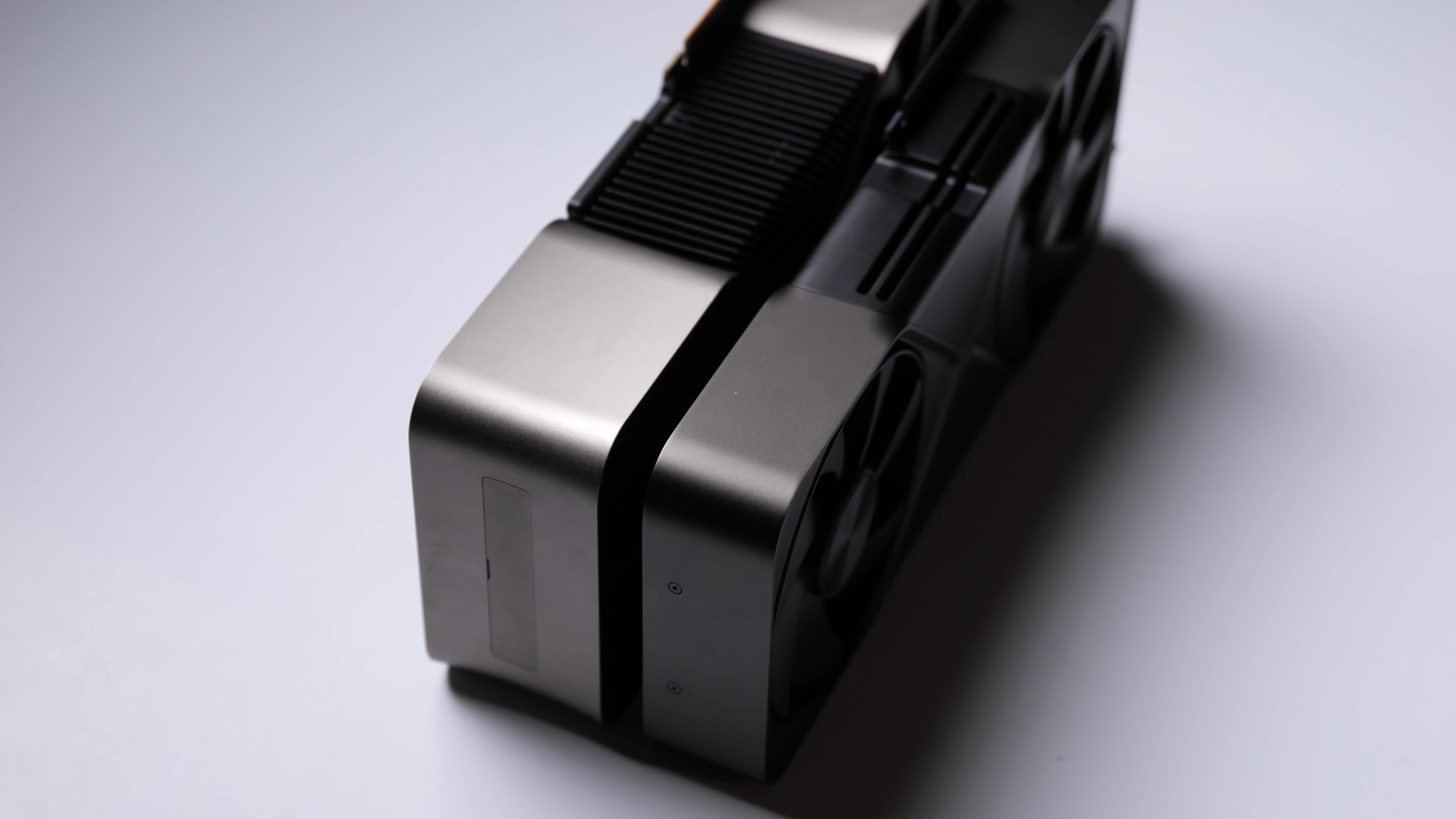
Size comparison between the RTX 5090 FE (right) and its predecessor, the RTX 4090 FE (left)

The RTX 5090 received a generally lukewarm reception, citing its overreliance on AI to find its value, the card requiring 125W more than the RTX 4090 (which is rated at 450W), and being significantly more expensive at $1999 than the RTX 4090, which had an MSRP of $1599. Many reviewers called the RTX 50 series marketing deceitful, considering that DLSS 4's Multi Frame Generation cannot make unplayable games playable, and cannot improve latency. Some reviewers even jokingly referred to it as the "RTX 4090 Ti".

=== RTX 5080 ===
Antony Leather from Forbes described the RTX 5080 as "a decent upgrade from anything below or older than the RTX 4080 Super and 4080". Nonetheless, he criticized that "there's only a 10% uplift over the RTX 4080 Super" in raw performance, with the RTX 4090 still being "quite a bit faster" without Multi Frame Generation, while the RTX 5080 only just overtakes the RTX 4090 with Multi Frame Generation enabled.

Andrew Cunningham from Ars Technica stated that the RTX 5080 "is the third-fastest GPU on the market [behind the RTX 5090 and RTX 4090], but it's far short of the 4090, and it performs more like a second refresh of 2022's RTX 4080". He praised the RTX 5080's MSRP of US$999 and described it as a "good 4K card", but called it "[b]arely an upgrade over the RTX 4080 Super".

IGN praised the RTX 5080's overall performance, modest increase in power demand over its predecessor, and MSRP, though noted that "[i]t's [...] not quite the performance uplift that hardcore enthusiasts who upgrade every generation are going to want to see". Also, while the 16 GB of VRAM "should be enough memory for most people", "it would have been nice to see the RTX 5080 adopt the 24GB featured on the RTX 4090, especially since this GPU is being pitched as a 4K graphics card".

=== RTX 5070 Ti ===
The RTX 5070 Ti had a lukewarm reception just like the RTX 5090 and RTX 5080. While it was generally praised for its competitive performance at 1440P and 4K resolutions relative to previous generation graphics cards, it also received criticism, most commonly for the card normally only being available at $900 or above, despite Nvidia's listed MSRP of $750.

Andrew Cunningham from Ars Technica called the RTX 5070 Ti "essentially an RTX 4080 that also supports DLSS Multi-Frame Generation". While the card was praised for its excellent overall performance and being capable of 4K gaming, it was criticized for its poor price-to-performance and mediocre performance uplift. TechPowerUp's review of the RTX 5070 Ti found large performance gains relative to the RTX 4070 Ti, praising its performance relative to AMD's at-the-time flagship RX 7900 XTX, the new DLSS 4 Frame Generation technology, and its efficiency and performance, although it did also receive criticism for its inflated MSRP. IGN praised the performance of the RTX 5070 Ti and its value relative to the RTX 5090 and RTX 5080, stating "Not only is it the first RTX 5000 graphics card that provides a decent uplift over its predecessor, but it does so with a lower price tag than the $799 RTX 4070 Ti".

=== RTX 5070 ===
The RTX 5070 received criticism for its poor value, offering only a marginal performance increase over the previous generation's RTX 4070 Super, with performance sometimes even trailing its predecessor. The card is a decent option for 1440p gaming, but Multi-Frame Generation introduces a responsiveness trade-off, and the limited 12GB of VRAM is seen as insufficient for the price, making it a difficult sell compared to the 4070 Super. Despite this, as of August 2025 the 5070 became the most popular current-gen GPU on Steam's hardware survey.

=== RTX 5060 Ti ===
The RTX 5060 Ti received moderate praise for its performance uplift over older RTX 4060 Ti and 3060 Ti cards, although much attention was brought to the 8GB version's low VRAM capacity. According to Tom's Hardware, the 8GB version was unable to perform well at higher resolutions.

The $50 price difference between the 5060 Ti 8GB and 16GB versions, in contrast to the previous generation $100 difference between the RTX 4060 Ti 8GB and 16GB, led to a general preference for the 5060 Ti 16GB, although much like the other RTX 50 Series cards, the 5060 Ti suffered pricing much higher than MSRP. TechPowerUp's review of the card noted that "On paper, the 8 GB variant is supposed to be priced at $380, and the 16 GB variant at $430, but we now know that these prices are pure fiction. The RTX 5060 Ti 16 GB is realistically available from $500 mark, $70 higher than Nvidia's starting price; while the RTX 5060 Ti 8 GB is priced closer to its natural MSRP".

=== RTX 5060 ===
Like the 5060 Ti 8GB, the RTX 5060 is, according to TechSpot, limited by its 8GB VRAM capacity. TechSpot's review stated that "It's frustrating how good the RTX 5060 could have been. Even with just 12 GB of VRAM, we might have been able to tentatively recommend it at its current price. With 16 GB, it could have been a genuinely solid product".

James Archer from Rock Paper Shotgun described the RTX 5060 as an affordable option for 1080p, but "not equipped" for 1440p, while Jacob Roach from XDA cited Intel's Arc B580 as "the one card that really kills the credibility of the RTX 5060", with its 12GB VRAM capacity. This despite the Arc B580 costing around $320 compared to the RTX 5060's $300 MSRP.

=== RTX 5050 ===
As with the RTX 5060, the RTX 5050 received some praise as an affordable option for gaming at 1080p but received criticism for its limited 8GB VRAM capacity.

== See also ==
- Arc B-Series – competing Intel GPU generation released in a similar time-frame
- Radeon RX 9000 series – competing AMD GPU generation released in a similar time-frame
