= Nvidia RTX Spark =

ARM-based system-on-chip by Nvidia

General information
- Designed by: Nvidia

Physical specifications
- Cores: 20 CPU cores
- Memory (RAM): Up to 128 GB unified memory
- GPU: Blackwell RTX GPU
- Co-processor: 5th-generation Tensor Cores

Architecture and classification
- Application: Windows laptops and compact desktop PCs
- Microarchitecture: Grace
- Instruction set: ARM

Nvidia RTX Spark is an ARM-based system on chip and computing platform developed by Nvidia for Windows laptops and compact desktop computers. Announced by Nvidia and Microsoft on May 31, 2026, RTX Spark combines a 20-core Nvidia Grace CPU with a Blackwell RTX GPU and unified memory, and is intended for local artificial intelligence, creative, and gaming workloads on Windows on Arm devices.

== History ==
Nvidia had previously supplied an ARM-based Tegra system-on-chip for Microsoft's Surface RT.

In October 2023, Reuters reported that Nvidia was developing ARM-based central processing units intended to run Windows, as part of Microsoft's effort to broaden the Windows on Arm hardware ecosystem. The same report stated that Microsoft's exclusivity arrangement with Qualcomm for Windows-compatible ARM chips was set to expire in 2024. In January 2025, Tom's Hardware reported that Nvidia was developing Windows on Arm chips under the codenames N1 and N1X, with MediaTek involved in the project.

At CES 2025, Nvidia announced Project DIGITS, later renamed DGX Spark, a compact AI-oriented computer based on the GB10 Grace Blackwell Superchip. In September 2025, Tom's Hardware reported that Nvidia CEO Jensen Huang had described N1 as the ARM product used in DGX Spark and related products, connecting the previously reported N1/N1X project with GB10-based systems.

Nvidia and Microsoft announced RTX Spark on May 31, 2026, at Nvidia GTC Taipei during Computex. Nvidia stated that MediaTek collaborated on RTX Spark's custom CPU design.

== Specifications ==
The announced RTX Spark configuration combines a 20-core Nvidia Grace CPU with a Blackwell RTX GPU containing 6,144 CUDA cores and fifth-generation Tensor Cores with FP4 precision. The CPU and GPU are connected using Nvidia's NVLink-C2C chip-to-chip interconnect. Nvidia rates the platform at up to one petaflop of FP4 AI performance, with support for up to 128 GB of unified memory.

Microsoft stated that Windows on RTX Spark includes optimizations for unified memory, workload profile scheduling on RTX Spark's heterogeneous architecture, power and thermal management through the Microsoft Power and Thermal Framework, and the Windows 11 Prism emulator for 32-bit and 64-bit x86 applications on Windows on Arm. The company also said RTX Spark PCs would join the Copilot+ PC category, with local AI processing through NPUs in addition to GPU acceleration. RTX Spark systems were announced for availability beginning in fall 2026.

Nvidia published official specifications for RTX Spark.And also article from Computerbase.de.

Branding and Model		CPU			GPU		Memory				TDP	Release date
Branding and Model		Cores	Clock (GHz)		Config	Clock (GHz)	Bus type & width	Max. capacity	Clock (MT/s)	Bandwidth (GB/s)	TDP	Release date
Branding and Model		Cores	X925	A725	Config	Clock (GHz)	Bus type & width	Max. capacity	Clock (MT/s)	Bandwidth (GB/s)	TDP	Release date
RTX Spark	N1X	10(X925)+10(A725)	4.1	2.8	6144:192:80: 48:192:48		LPDDR5X; 256-bit	128 GB	9400	300.8	45–80 W	October 2026
RTX Spark	N1X	9(X925)+9(A725)	3.9	2.8	5120:160:64: 40:160:40		LPDDR5X; 256-bit	32 GB	9400	300.8	45–80 W	October 2026

== Software support ==
Microsoft and Nvidia stated that RTX Spark systems would support native ARM versions of creative and technical applications, including Adobe Photoshop and Premiere, Affinity, Bitwig Studio, Blender, CapCut, Cinema 4D, Cubase, DaVinci Resolve, MATLAB, and Redshift through Prism. Microsoft also stated that Windows game compatibility on RTX Spark would be supported by native anti-cheat implementations from Epic's Easy Anti-Cheat and BattlEye, expanded Prism compatibility, and Xbox PC app support.

== Devices ==
Nvidia stated that RTX Spark laptops and compact desktops would be available in fall 2026 from Asus, Dell, HP, Lenovo, Microsoft, and MSI, with models from Acer and Gigabyte to follow. Microsoft announced the Surface Laptop Ultra as one of the first RTX Spark-based laptops. Microsoft also announced the Surface RTX Spark Dev Box, a compact developer system using RTX Spark with 128 GB of unified memory and a 100-watt thermal envelope. Preorders for the Surface Laptop Ultra opened on October 7, 2026, starting at $2,599.99, with general availability beginning October 16, 2026.

== Nvidia DGX ==
=== DGX Spark ===
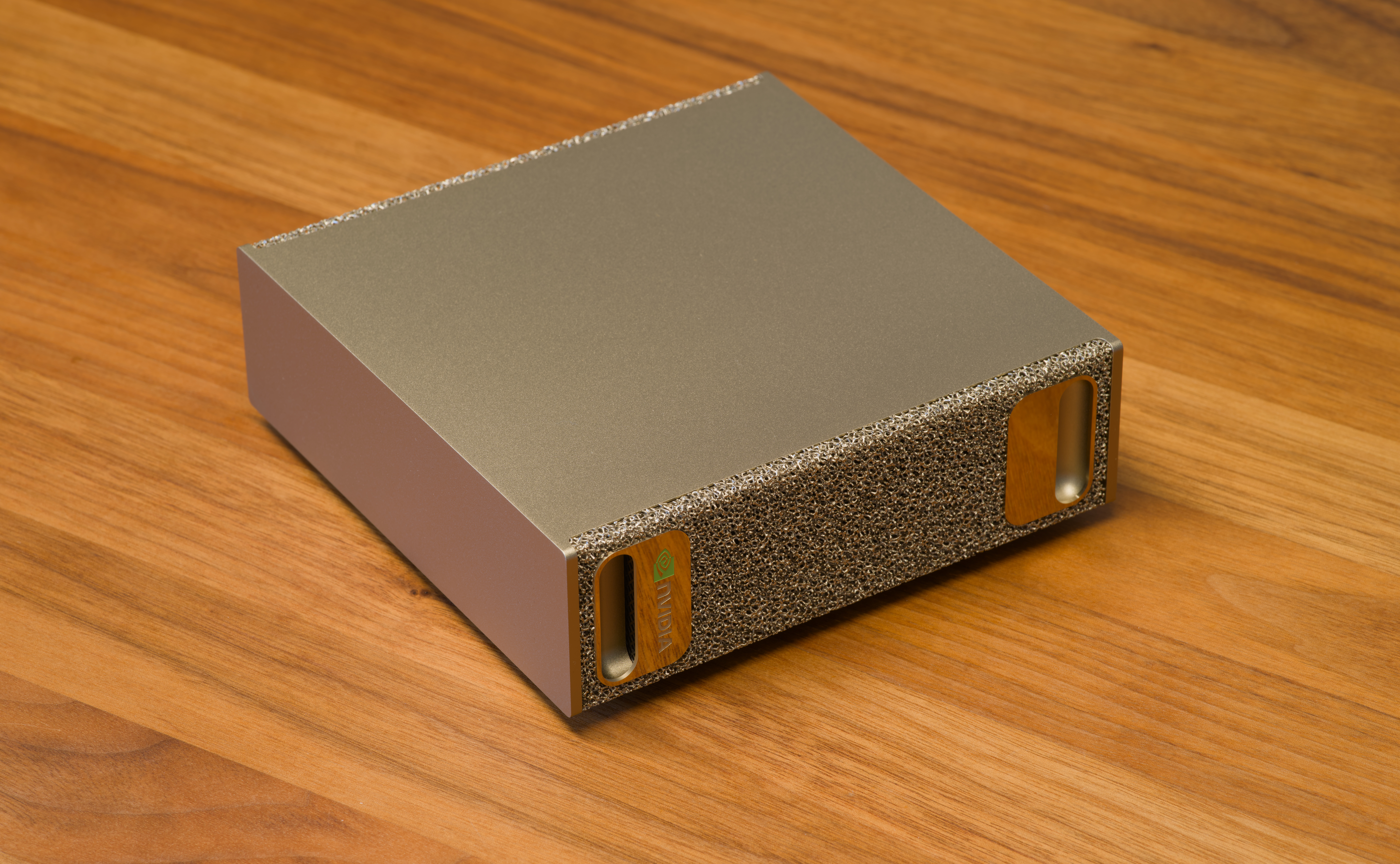
Nvidia DGX Spark

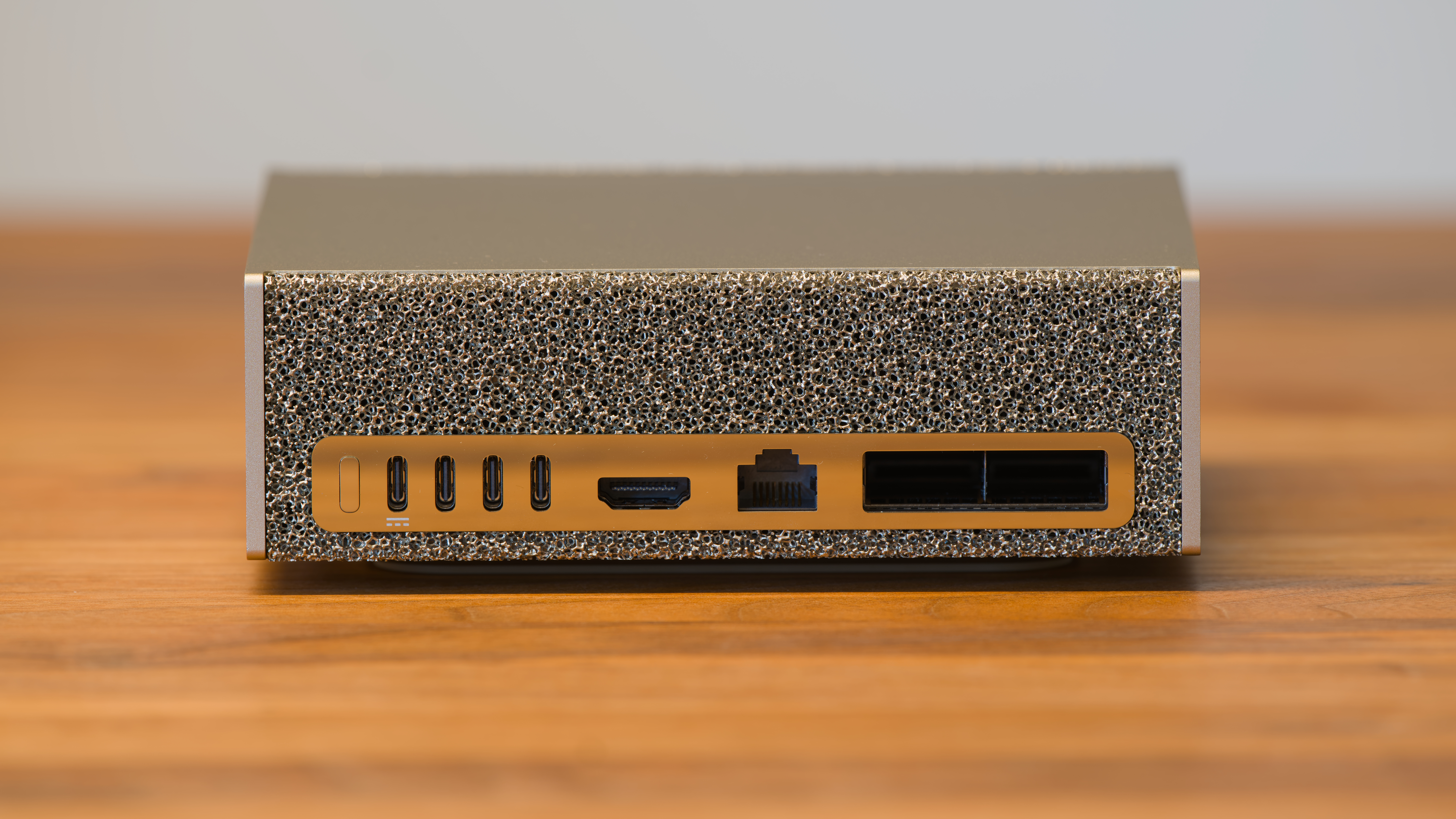
Rear ports of the DGX Spark, showing the ConnectX-7 NIC

In March 2025, Nvidia announced the DGX Spark, previously known as Project DIGITS, a compact "desktop AI supercomputer" based on a Blackwell GPU and ARM CPU. The system is intended for artificial intelligence researchers and developers and includes 128 GB of unified memory, allowing it to run inference workloads using models with up to 200 billion parameters locally. Several partner manufacturers also offer systems based on the DGX Spark platform.

Unlike the Windows-oriented RTX Spark systems, DGX Spark is supplied with Nvidia DGX OS, an Ubuntu-based Linux distribution customized with Nvidia drivers, platform-specific optimizations, and diagnostic tools for artificial intelligence workloads. Nvidia has stated that developers may experiment with other Linux distributions, although its diagnostics and workloads are validated only on DGX OS, and systems may need to be restored to DGX OS before receiving service or support.

DGX Spark became available in late 2025.

== See also ==
- Qualcomm Snapdragon
