= GDDR7 SDRAM =

Type of graphics card memory

GDDR7 SDRAM Graphics Double Data Rate 7 Synchronous Dynamic Random-Access Memory
- Type of RAM
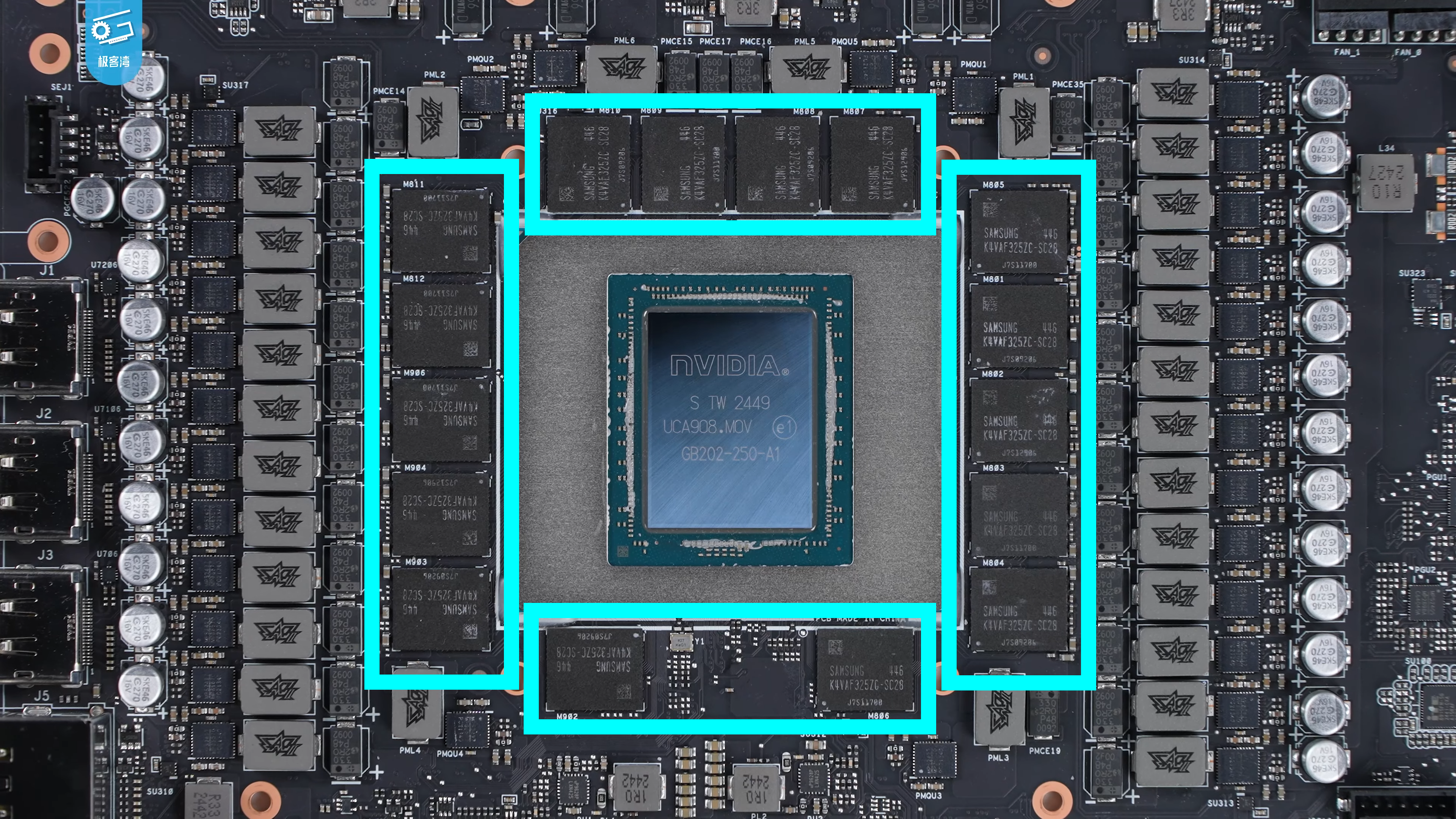
- PCB of the Nvidia GeForce RTX 5090D with sixteen GDDR7 chips (each chip 16 Gibibits)
- Developer: JEDEC
- Type: Synchronous dynamic random-access memory
- Generation: 7th generation
- Release date: March 5, 2024; 2 years ago
- Predecessor: GDDR6 SDRAM

Graphics Double Data Rate 7 Synchronous Dynamic Random-Access Memory (GDDR7 SDRAM) is a type of synchronous graphics random-access memory (SGRAM) with a high-bandwidth, "double data rate" interface, designed for use in graphics cards and high-performance computing. It is a type of GDDR SDRAM (graphics DDR SDRAM), and is the successor to GDDR6.

== History ==
- At Samsung Tech Day 2022, Samsung announced GDDR7 as the successor of GDDR6X, which could deliver up to 36 GT/s. Samsung announced two months later that it would use PAM-3 signaling to achieve the highest transfer rate.
- On March 8, 2023, Cadence announced the verification solution tool for preliminary GDDR7 SDRAM production.
- On June 30, 2023, Micron announced that it will be manufactured using 1β node (equivalent to 12–10 nm process node), slated to release in H1 2024.
- On July 18, 2023, Samsung announced the first generation of GDDR7, which can reach up to 32 Gbps per pin (100% higher bandwidth per pin compared to 16 Gbps per pin on GDDR6) and 20% more energy efficient. For packaging material, it will use epoxy molding compound (EMC) along with IC architecture optimization, which will reduce thermal resistance by 70%. Later, on a Q&A session, Samsung mentioned that it will be manufactured using D1z node (equivalent to 15–14 nm) and will operate on 1.2V. A 1.1V version with reduced clockspeeds will also be made available at some point in to the future after the release of the 1.2V version.
- On March 5, 2024, JEDEC published the GDDR7 Graphics Memory formal standard and specifications.

== Technologies ==
GDDR7 SDRAM uses three-level (−1, 0, +1) pulse-amplitude modulation (PAM-3), replacing GDDR6'S NRZ and GDDR6x's PAM-4. PAM-3 transfers three bits in two cycles, while NRZ transfers one bit in one cycle. PAM-3 is 20% more energy-efficient than NRZ while running at a higher bandwidth. Manufacturing equipment will be less costly than PAM-4.

GDDR7 adds on-die error correction code, error checking and scrubbing features for chip reliability, mainly useful for compute/AI use cases.

Initial data rates are at 32 Gbps/pin, while memory manufacturers have noted that rates up to 36 Gbps/pin are readily attainable. The standard has future bandwidth up to 48 Gbps/pin, and chip capacities up to 64 Gbit—compared to GDDR6X's 16 Gbit.

== See also ==
- List of interface bit rates
