= Linus Sebastian =

Canadian YouTuber (born 1986)

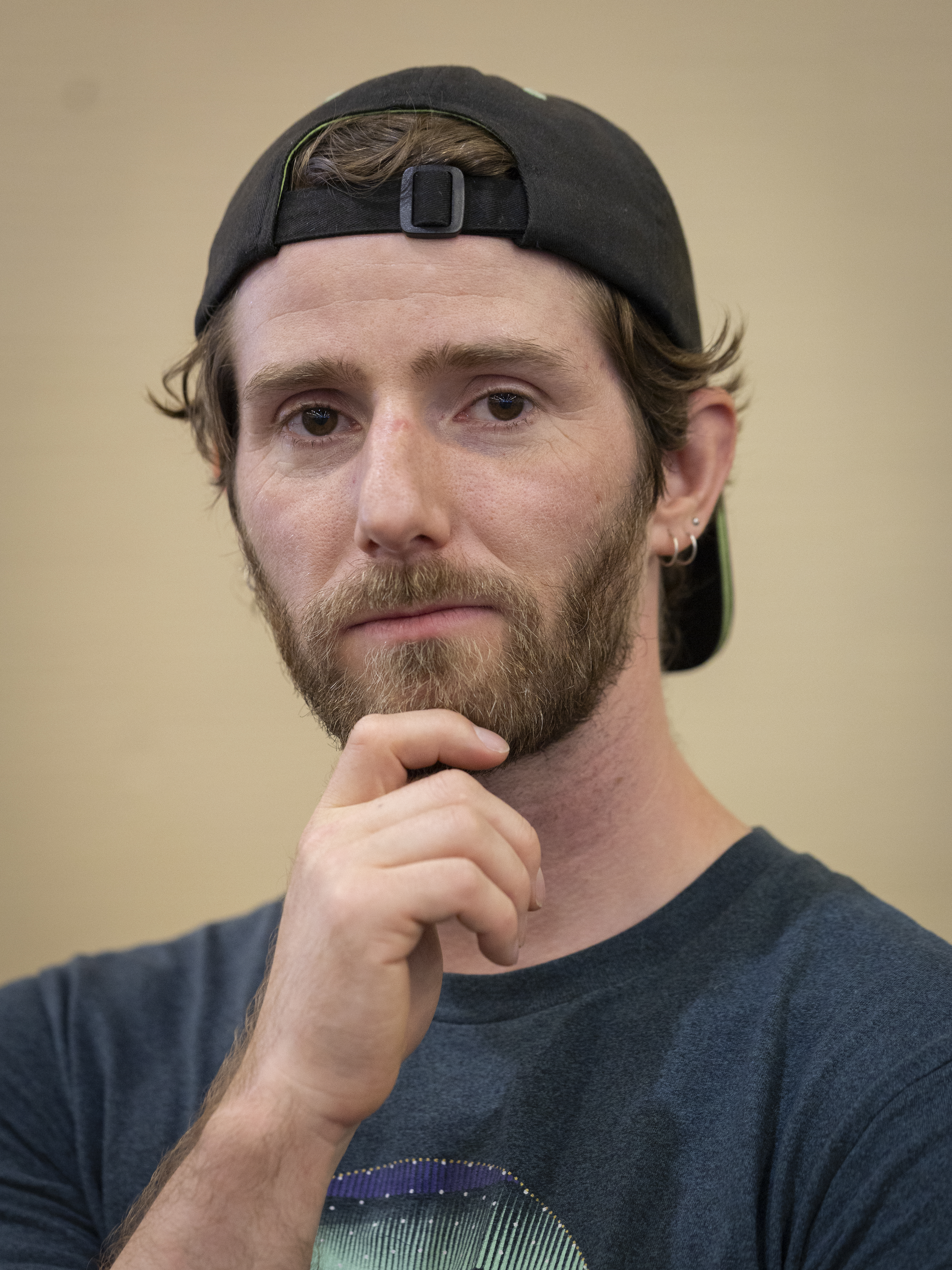
- Sebastian in 2026
- Born: Linus Gabriel Sebastian; August 20, 1986 (age 40); Ladner, British Columbia, Canada
- Education: University of British Columbia (dropped out)
- Occupations: YouTuber; video presenter; technology demonstrator; entrepreneur
- Years active: 2007–present
- Employer: Linus Media Group - Present NCIX - (2007–2013)
- Television: Scrapyard Wars (2015–present)
- Title: Chief vision officer of Linus Media Group (2023–present); Chief executive officer of Linus Media Group (2013–2023)
- Spouse: Yvonne Ho (m. 2011)
- Children: 3

YouTube information
- Channel: Linus Tech Tips
- Genre: Technology
- Subscribers: 16.9 million (main channel)
- Views: 9.63 billion (main channel)
- Last updated: June 27, 2026
- Website: linusmediagroup.com

Linus Gabriel Sebastian (born August 20, 1986) is a Canadian YouTuber known for his technology-oriented channel Linus Tech Tips. He is the founder and former chief executive officer of Linus Media Group, and chief vision officer of the company, as well as a regular presenter.

In the 2000s, Sebastian served as the principal on-camera presenter for the now-defunct Canadian computer retailer NCIX, where he created his flagship channel Linus Tech Tips (LTT) in November 2008. In October 2012, he founded Linus Media Group (LMG), formally launching it in 2013. Sebastian led LMG as chief executive officer until July 1, 2023, when he transitioned to the role of chief vision officer to focus on the company's long-term strategy and creative directions.

As of January 20, 2026, Linus Tech Tips has amassed over 16.8 million subscribers and more than 9.6 billion views. Across all his channels, Sebastian has over 32 million subscribers (Note: Subscribers, broken down by channel: 16.5 million (Linus Tech Tips); 4.33 million (Techquickie); 1.95 million (TechLinked); 2.42 million (ShortCircuit); 1.26 million (Channel Super Fun); 596 thousand (LMG Clips); 613 thousand (Mac Address); 235 thousand (LinusCatTips); 32.6 thousand (PSU Circuit); 139 thousand (They're Just Movies); 474 thousand (GameLinked)) and more than 12 billion views. (Note: Views, broken down by channel: 8.05 billion (Linus Tech Tips); 876.5 million (Techquickie); 527.4 million (TechLinked); 566.45 million (ShortCircuit); 372.23 million (Channel Super Fun); 264.79 million (LMG Clips); 125.15 million (Mac Address); 11.16 million (LinusCatTips); 4.68 million (They're Just Movies); 25 million (GameLinked))

== Early and personal life ==
Linus Gabriel Sebastian was born on August 20, 1986, and grew up on a hobby farm in Maple Ridge, British Columbia. (Note: I Make Questionable Choices Sometimes... Linus Media Group. March 13, 2023.) He was named after Linus Pauling, the Nobel Prize-winning American chemist. He was diagnosed with ADHD as a child.

Prior to his technology career, Sebastian briefly worked as a house painter by trade. However, he suffered from suspected depression during his second year of house painting for Student Works and quit his job as a result. Around that time, Sebastian studied at the University of British Columbia. After struggling with calculus, Sebastian was put on scholastic probation, prompting him to change his course subjects to psychology and English. Despite performing better academically, Sebastian questioned the value of his degree and dropped out before graduating, a move supported by his future wife Yvonne Ho, and took up a full time position with the computer store NCIX instead.

Sebastian has been married to Ho since April 2011. He is also the father of three children: a son and two daughters.

== Career ==
Sebastian worked for the Canadian online computer store NCIX in various roles, including as a sales representative and product manager. He was asked to be the host for its technology YouTube channel, NCIX Tech Tips, which was created to help demonstrate products. Sebastian was assisted by an unidentified cameraperson and editor, and worked with limited resources, shooting videos with a camera borrowed from the son of the company's president. The first NCIX Tech Tips video hosted by Sebastian was uploaded on 24 July 2007.

Due to high production costs, rising brand partner demands, and relatively low viewership of NCIX Tech Tips, Sebastian was instructed to create the Linus Tech Tips channel; this would allow Sebastian to produce content more rapidly, initially at a lower production value kept distinct from the NCIX brand. He described TigerDirect and eventually Newegg as competitors. Linus Tech Tips was created on November 24, 2008 and the first video for the channel was uploaded the following day.

Seeing the opportunity in online content creation, Sebastian eventually left NCIX and founded Linus Media Group (LMG) following a dispute regarding company management. He negotiated an agreement in which he could keep Linus Tech Tips as a property of LMG for $1, as long as he signed a long-term agreement to help build an in-house NCIX video team, signed a 2-year non-compete clause, and continued to host videos for NCIX at a rate described by him as "very bargain-basement" for 2 years.

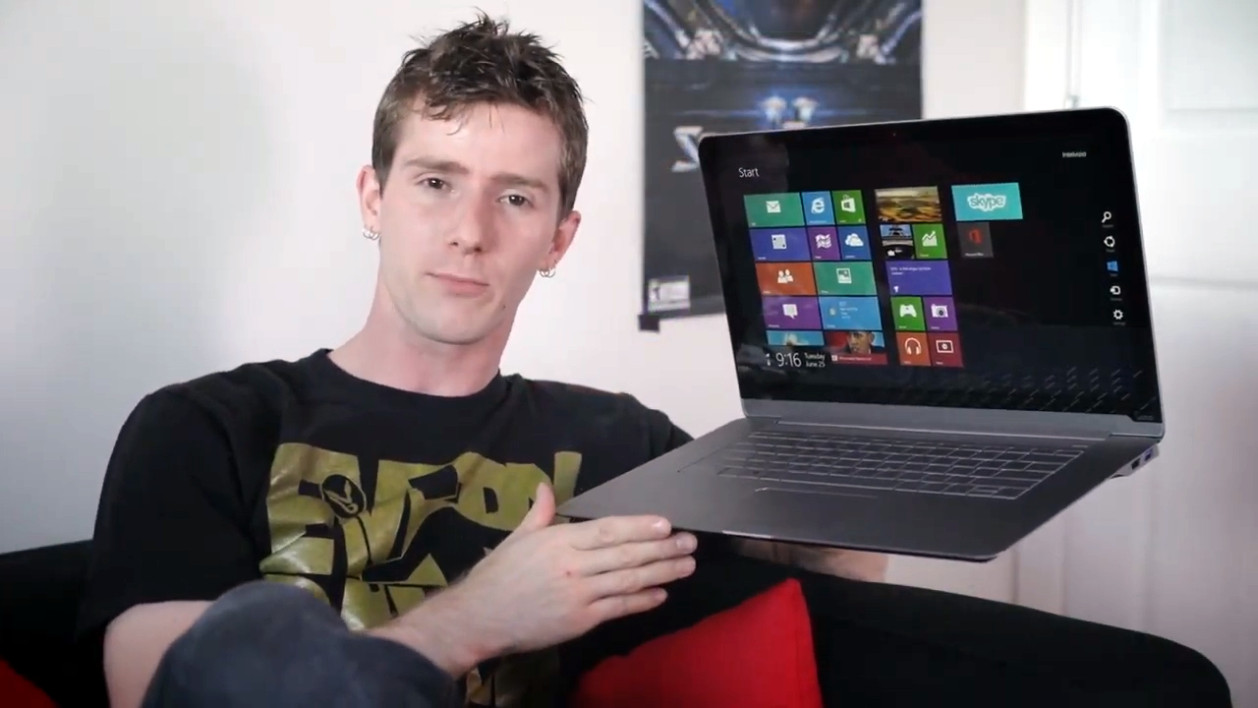
Sebastian in a 2013 video featuring Windows 8

In 2020, Sebastian claimed he was thinking about retiring. On May 18, 2023, Sebastian announced that he would be stepping down as chief executive officer of Linus Media Group and its subsidiaries on July 1, 2023. He then transitioned into a role entitled Chief Vision Officer.

In August 2023, a controversy emerged after Gamers Nexus, a YouTube channel, published a video about Sebastian and LMG stating that Sebastian had inappropriately demonstrated a prototype water block made by manufacturer Billet Labs by installing it on an Nvidia RTX 4090 GPU for which it was not designed for, rather than the recommended RTX 3090, and questioned the "accuracy, ethics, and responsibility" of the production. LMG was also criticised for failing to return the water block to Billet Labs and instead selling it in a charity auction, which Sebastian said was the result of a "miscommunication". LMG paused video production for 10 days while it investigated the claims. In a response, Sebastian rejected that LMG had an accuracy issue regarding the situation but regretted how it had been handled, and said that LMG would review and improve internal processes.

Sebastian was involved in the making of War of the Worlds (2025), working remotely during the COVID-19 pandemic. He was consulted as a technical advisor, and also acted a scene over webcam. Sebastian says the scene was cut from release and the technical advice was ultimately not used to inform the screenplay, and he had requested his name be removed from the official credits.

== Notable events ==
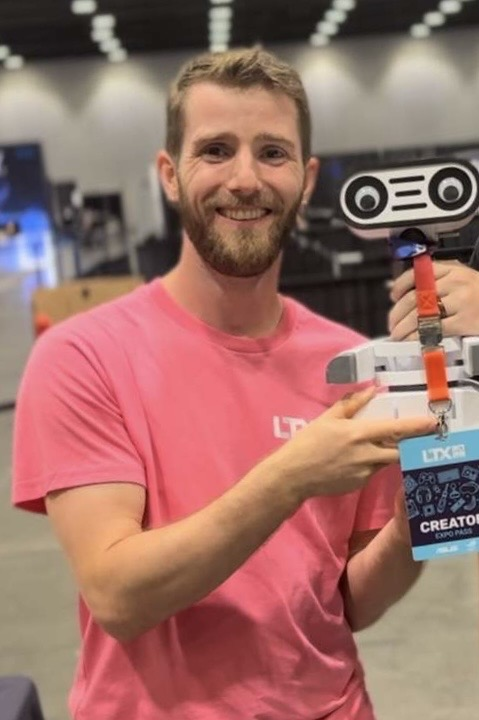
Linus Sebastian at LTX 2023, holding a TASBot

In a 2014 interview with technology startup website Tech.co, Sebastian said that his favourite YouTubers were TotalBiscuit, Marques Brownlee, and Austin Evans. Later, he remarked that he "threw out TotalBiscuit because he was one of the only names of YouTubers [he] knew."

Sebastian is an advocate of the right to repair. In September 2021, he disclosed a personal investment of nearly $225,000 in Framework Computer, a manufacturer of modular laptops which embraces this philosophy, after discussing the implications of such investment on LMG's podcast The WAN Show in July 2021.

On March 24, 2023, Sebastian declared on the Linus Tech Tips channel, that they had suffered a major session hijacking attack from opening a file containing sponsorship details, which caused them to temporarily lose all of their channels, losing revenue in the process. A video was later published on the Linus Tech Tips channel about the incident explaining that the company had downloaded a Trojan horse in the guise of a PDF file from a seemingly legitimate sponsor email, allowing for the attack.

On January 13, 2025, Sebastian made his first guest appearance on The Tonight Show Starring Jimmy Fallon where he demonstrated technology from the 2025 Consumer Electronics Show (CES). He appeared on the show again on January 15, 2026, following CES 2026.

On November 30, 2025, Linux creator Linus Torvalds appeared as a guest on Linus Tech Tips.

== Listicles ==
Publisher	Year	Listicle	Placement	Ref.
Inc. (magazine)	2015	Top 30 Power Players in Tech	4th	

== Publications ==
- The ABC's of Gaming: An alphabet book for little gamers (2020, illustrated by Sarah Butt)
