= Linus Media Group =

Canadian entertainment company

Linus Media Group Inc.
- Type: Private
- Industry: Entertainment
- Founded: October 3, 2012; 14 years ago in Surrey, British Columbia, Canada
- Founders: Linus Sebastian; Yvonne Ho
- Headquarters: Surrey, British Columbia, Canada
- Key people: Terren Tong (CEO); Yvonne Ho (CFO); Luke Lafreniere (CTO); Linus Sebastian(CVO); Colton Potter (CRO)
- Number of employees: 120 (as of January 2026)
- Divisions: LTT Labs
- Subsidiaries: Floatplane Media Inc.; Creator Warehouse Inc.; LTX Expo Inc.
- Website: linusmediagroup.com

The Linus Tech Tips logo since August 2018

Linus Media Group Inc. (LMG) is a privately held Canadian digital media entertainment company with a focus on technology, founded by Linus Sebastian and Yvonne Ho in 2012. The company owns and operates several technology-oriented YouTube channels and podcasts, as their production agency and distributor. Linus Tech Tips was later developed into an internet forum on January 2, 2013.

Some of LMG's most well-known channels include flagship channel Linus Tech Tips (LTT), Techquickie, TechLinked, and ShortCircuit.

After ten years as the CEO, Sebastian stepped down effective July 1, 2023, replaced by Terren Tong. Sebastian and his wife, Yvonne Ho, remain the owners, and Sebastian transitioned to chief visionary officer.

== History ==
=== 2012–2022: Beginnings and growth ===
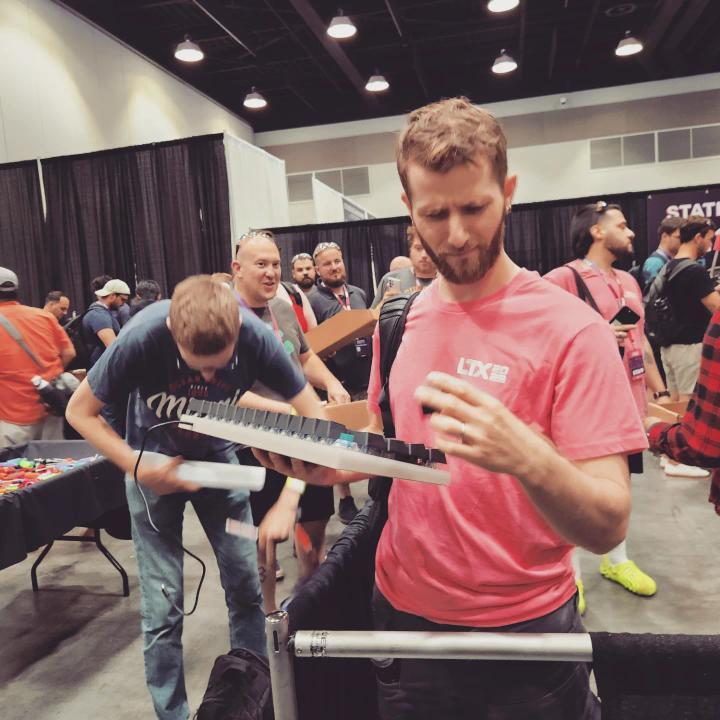
Linus Sebastian (CVO) at LTX 2023, an LMG event

British Columbia native Linus Sebastian and several others launched Linus Media Group in January 2013 out of a garage, while the company was incorporated in October 2012.

Previously, Sebastian worked for the now-defunct Canadian online computer retailer NCIX and later on was a host for the retailer's online video content. Due to high production costs, rising brand partner demands, and relatively low viewership during the early days of NCIX Tech Tips, Sebastian was instructed to create the Linus Tech Tips channel as a cheaper offshoot of the NCIX channel, to allow for lower production values without affecting the NCIX brand. He described TigerDirect and Newegg as competitors. Linus Tech Tips was created on November 24, 2008 and the first video for the channel was uploaded the following day. Seeing the opportunity in online content creation, Sebastian eventually left NCIX and founded LMG following a dispute regarding company management. He negotiated an agreement in which he could keep Linus Tech Tips as a property of LMG for $1, as long as he signed a long-term agreement to help build an in-house NCIX video team, signed a two-year non-compete clause, and continued to host videos for NCIX at a rate described by him as "very bargain-basement" for two years.

Within two years of its establishment, in 2014, Tubefilter named Linus Tech Tips as being within the "top 1% of Google's preferred advertising channels" on YouTube for the technology category.

On November 17, 2021, Sebastian announced the creation of LTT Labs, a division dedicated to testing the validity of manufacturer claims.

=== March 2023: YouTube channel hack ===
On March 23, 2023, Linus Tech Tips, TechLinked, and Techquickie were hacked and subsequently terminated due to a security breach. The hackers changed the channel names, changing the main channel name to Tesla and started broadcasting two identical live streams which appeared to show deepfakes of Elon Musk, Jack Dorsey, and others having a conversation about Ethereum, GPT-4, and other topics. The hackers also unlisted many videos and later re-published them as well as uploaded videos with titles that stated "DONOTUPLOAD" and subsequently changed the name to LinusTechTipsTemp to seem more legitimate. Sometime before 11:51 am UTC, all hacked channels were terminated, although it is unclear if it was by the hackers or by YouTube. Around 3 pm UTC, Sebastian published a message on Floatplane, saying that he had everything "locked down" and that he is working with Google to get everything reinstated. At approximately 3 am UTC, all hacked channels were reinstated, with most unauthorised changes reverted some time later. A video was later published on the Linus Tech Tips channel about the incident explaining that an employee had downloaded a Trojan horse in the guise of a PDF file from a seemingly legitimate sponsor email, allowing a session hijacking attack.

=== May 2023: Leadership changes ===
On May 18, 2023, Sebastian announced that he would be stepping down as chief executive officer of LMG and its subsidiaries, and would be transitioning into a creative role entitled Chief Vision Officer, effective July 1, 2023. Terren Tong, previously an executive of Corsair Gaming and whom Sebastian worked under during his time at NCIX, was named to replace Sebastian as CEO. In the announcement, Sebastian mentioned he had received a buyout offer for the company from an unnamed entity, valuing it at around $100 million. Sebastian declined the offer.

== Controversies ==
==== Allegations of hostile work environment ====
On August 16, 2023, former Linus Media Group employee Madison Reeve, who was previously hired after appearing in a Linus Tech Tips video with Sebastian for winning a competition and left the company in late 2021, alleged within a Twitter thread of a hostile work environment while she worked at the company, including instances of assault, sexism, and other inappropriate conduct. She was reportedly scolded for taking sick days, which drove her to commit self-harm, because she saw it as "the only way in my mind to take a day off without being harassed for a reason why".

Reeve said that she did not previously make these allegations public, because she "feared even more backlash from a community that was already attacking, defaming, and sending [her] death threats", and that her experience has been "eating away at [her] for 2 years." According to Reeve, the company suffered from problems with "ego and the bottom line" and that there was an "internal paranoia" about employees leaving the company and setting up their own content creation platforms.

In an email to The Verge, Linus Sebastian said that Reeve's allegations "aren't consistent with [his] recollections", but said that Linus Media Group's human resources department would be conducting an internal review. In an additional comment, CEO Terren Tong said that along with the internal review of the allegations, the company would be hiring an outside investigator and publish its findings.

In May 2024, the company claimed, in a statement, that the third-party investigation found the allegations of sexual harassment, bullying, abuse of power and retaliation were unsubstantiated, but found that the allegations of process errors and miscommunication while on-boarding were partially substantiated. Notably, the company did not release findings from the third-party investigation, contradicting their aforementioned commitment to The Verge from the CEO.

==== Community Guidelines violation and channel hiatuses ====
In September 2024, Linus Tech Tips had its video "De-Google Your Life – Part 2: Ad-Free YouTube!", the second part of a series on decreasing reliance on Google, removed for violating YouTube's Community Guidelines. In the removed video, ad-blocking tools to avoid ads and tracking, alternatives to YouTube, and tools to watch YouTube's videos without ads were discussed. Linus Tech Tips later released a video stating that the channel had been issued a 90-day Community Guidelines warning and that the video was removed for "harmful or dangerous content", which applied to "content that violates YouTube's Terms of Service, or that encourages others to do", including "content that provide[d] instructions about how to download YouTube videos in an unauthorised manner". Louis Rossmann criticised Google for punishing Linus Tech Tips for promoting tools and software that protect user privacy but hurt Google's business, and implied that the action might signal anti-competitive behavior by Google.

On November 14, 2024, Mac Address, Techquickie and GameLinked each announced that their channel was going on hiatus for an indeterminate amount of time.

On January 29, 2026, GameLinked resumed uploading weekly.

Linus Media Group faced additional controversy in 2026 after longtime staff left, citing concerns about pay disparities within the company or an inability to create new content beyond the company's technology focus. In response, Sebastian shared a Rickrolling video on X and stated in a later deleted post that he had "no f***s left".

==== Misconduct Allegations from GamersNexus ====
On June 24, 2023, Linus Tech Tips uploaded a video demonstrating a prototype dual water block from Billet Labs. The video involved Linus and fellow LMG employee Adam Sondergard testing the block with a GeForce RTX 4090 graphics card, even though the unit had been specifically designed for the GeForce RTX 3090 Ti. Sondergard advised that they re-test the block using a 3090 Ti; however, Sebastian decided to publish the video of testing with the 4090, justifying this by saying that re-testing would not change the outcome of the video. Sebastian concluded that the dual design had no advantages and criticized the building experience, saying that consumers should not buy the product.

The demonstration led to a video (published August 14) from GamersNexus, a tech YouTube channel, in which GamersNexus editor-in-chief Steve Burke stated that Linus Tech Tips had sold the prototype during a silent charity auction at LTX 2023 without the consent of Billet Labs (who had sent the prototype to LMG not expecting a return). More broadly, GamersNexus accused Linus Tech Tips of "rushing content out the door" and tarnishing its "accuracy, ethics, and responsibility". They cited a number of videos in which Linus Tech Tips had made mistakes which in the eyes of GamersNexus were corrected in an insufficient manner, or not at all.

Sebastian made a written response to GamersNexus, saying that the company had experienced "growing pains" and would strive to increase the quality of their work in the future, but he defended not retesting the prototype with the proper graphics card as he saw that it would not improve the results and called the product an "egregious waste of money." Burke criticized this response as "unhinged" and "unapologetic". Linus Media Group later agreed to compensate Billet Labs for the cost of the prototype.

A video featuring Sebastian, CEO Terren Tong, and CFO Yvonne Ho was later published to the Linus Tech Tips channel on August 16, 2023, apologizing for the handling of the prototype water block along with their response to the situation. In the video, Linus Media Group also announced a week-long video production pause, which actually lasted ten days, while changes were made at the company. The apology video was criticized for being monetized as well as featuring jokes about sponsorships and links to the channel's store page. The video was demonetized by Linus Media Group following the criticism. The store page was also linked in the video's description, but Dexerto noted that this could have been automated by YouTube and not purposefully placed. In response to a comment on Floatplane, Linus Media Group's video sharing platform, suggesting the jokes be removed, Sebastian responded through the Linus Tech Tips account, saying that "We won't be able to make everyone perfectly happy, so what we're going to do is be ourselves—the best version of ourselves—and move past this", and asked "Is a little humor a bad thing...? Honest question".

== Organization ==
Currently, LMG is headquartered in Surrey, British Columbia, Canada. As of January 2026, it has about 120 employees.

The company has several subsidiaries:

Name	Incorporation date	Purpose
LTX Expo Inc.	January 21, 2020	Was used to handle the LTX Expo, an annual summer event which LMG hosted from 2017 to 2023. It was described as a "convention featuring tech-focused content creators and personalities".
Creator Warehouse Inc.	September 17, 2018	Merchandise company founded by Sebastian that creates and sells LMG branded merchandise, tools and affiliate products through its own dedicated website, LTTstore.com.
Floatplane Media Inc. (Note: Doing business as Floatplane)	April 3, 2017	Online streaming service founded by Sebastian that offers creators a platform to upload and monetize their content. One of its main selling points is its support for higher bit rate compared to YouTube. All videos are behind a paywall.

It also has one spinoff:

Name	Incorporation date	Purpose
Adequate Media Inc.	January 1, 2026	Holding company for The WAN Show, co-owned by Linus Sebastian, Yvonne Ho and Luke Lafreniere.

== Notable videos ==
On November 24, 2011, Linus Tech Tips uploaded a video unboxing a remote-control fire truck sourced by a heat sink manufacturer, which had become the most viewed video on the channel in January 2017 with 7 million views since being uploaded, and the second most viewed video on the channel in June 2020 with 11 million views since being uploaded.

On January 2, 2016, Linus Tech Tips released a video demonstrating a computer capable of supporting seven individual users at once, with an estimated total cost of $30,000. The video made technology news on a number of websites.

In August 2017, the Linus Tech Tips channel uploaded a two part video where they were able to game at 16K resolution (15360 by 8640 pixels) using sixteen 4K monitors in a 4 by 4 configuration.

In April 2018, the Linus Tech Tips channel uploaded a video claiming that Apple refused to repair Sebastian's iMac Pro after Linus Tech Tips staff damaged it in a product teardown, a refusal that VentureBeat speculated is illegal.

In December 2018, Linus Tech Tips released a four-part series detailing their experience buying a gaming PC from 6 systems integrators representing 3 different market tiers. The series has gained over 12 million views and was covered in PC Gamer.

In 2021, Linus Tech Tips released a three-part series showing the process of making an 18-carat gold Xbox Series X controller. The first video showed the prototyping, the second the making of the gold shells, and the third the reactions of employees at their headquarters.

In May 2025, Linus Tech Tips released a video where they calculated 300 trillion digits of Pi with the help of Kioxia and y-cruncher, breaking the world record for digits of Pi calculated. The project took about a year to complete, with the first calculation starting in August 2024 and the calculation finishing in April 2025.

== List of YouTube channels ==
=== Active channels ===
Channel	Description	Subscribers (Note: Subscribers, views and videos updated as of April 15, 2025)	Views	Videos	Creation date	Main Host(s)
Linus Tech Tips	Flagship channel; long-form technology-related videos	16.9 million	9.13 billion	7,009	November 25, 2008	Linus Sebastian
Techquickie	Short-form technology-related videos.	4.33 million	912 million	1,269	January 15, 2012 (Note: first video uploaded on January 6, 2013)	Various
TechLinked	Technology and gaming news, produced thrice-weekly; also a podcast	1.99 million	631 million	1,220	May 3, 2018	Riley Murdock
GameLinked	Gaming news videos, produced weekly.	463 thousand	33.2 million	154	July 22, 2022 (Note: first video uploaded on June 29, 2023)	Riley Murdock
LMG Clips	Highlight clips from their popular videos and livestreams	629 thousand	342 million	2,333	September 21, 2019	N/A
ShortCircuit	Technology-related unboxings	2.51 million	729 million	1,126	January 24, 2020	Various
WAN Show	LMG's weekly long form podcast, The WAN Show.	71.1 thousand	796 thousand	4	June 25, 2026	Linus Sebastian, Luke Lafreniere

=== Inactive channels ===
Channel	Description	Subscribers	Views	Videos	Creation date	Inactive since	Main Host(s)
Channel Super Fun	Miscellaneous videos and game show–esque challenges	1.25 million	386 million	195	May 28, 2014	August 25, 2025	Dennis Liao (Note: Has since left, reported on June 13, 2025)
They're Just Movies (Note: They're Just Movies was formerly known as Carpool Critics.)	Film-related vlogcast and podcast	137 thousand	4.79 million	161	December 20, 2019	December 30, 2022	James Strieb, Riley Murdock, David Gauthier
Mac Address	Apple-related videos	603 thousand	131 million	122	January 26, 2021 (Note: (first video uploaded on April 16, 2021)	November 30, 2024	Jonathan Horst
PSU Circuit	Standardized analytical insights into power supplies	35.7 thousand	619 thousand	58	Mar 1, 2024	Jan 3, 2026	Text to speech voice, reads standardized script based on testing.

== Alumni ==
Some former on-screen staff have gone on to create their own notable YouTube channels

- Jake Tivy (aka Jakkuh) – Has bought a farm where his channel will focus on Tech projects, DIY farm renovation, building a dream workshop, and upgrading rural infrastructure
- Alex Clark and Andy Zhang – co-founders of "Zip Tie Tuning" and "Zip Tie Tech" focused on automotive content and independent tech/projects
- Jonathan Horst – created channel "Thinking Different" in February 2026
- Emily Young – Launched an independent self-titled personal channel
- Elijah Horner – Went full-time on livestreaming on Twitch while also creating long-form videos on YouTube
