= 4080 =

4080 may refer to:

- 4080, a number in the 4000 range
- AD 4080, a year of the 5th millennium CE
- 4080 BC, a year in the 5th millennium BCE
- RTX 4080, an Nvidia graphics card
  - RTX 4080 SUPER, an Nvidia graphics card
- 4080th Strategic Reconnaissance Wing, a United States Air Force wing
- USS Imperator (ID-4080), another name for the German ocean liner SS Imperator
- 4080 Galinskij, a minor planet
- State Road 4080, another name for the Florida State Road 408 tolled expressway
- Rickenbacker 4080, a double neck guitar
- 4080peru, a rock band
