= NCIX =

Defunct Canadian computer retailer

NCIX Computer Inc.
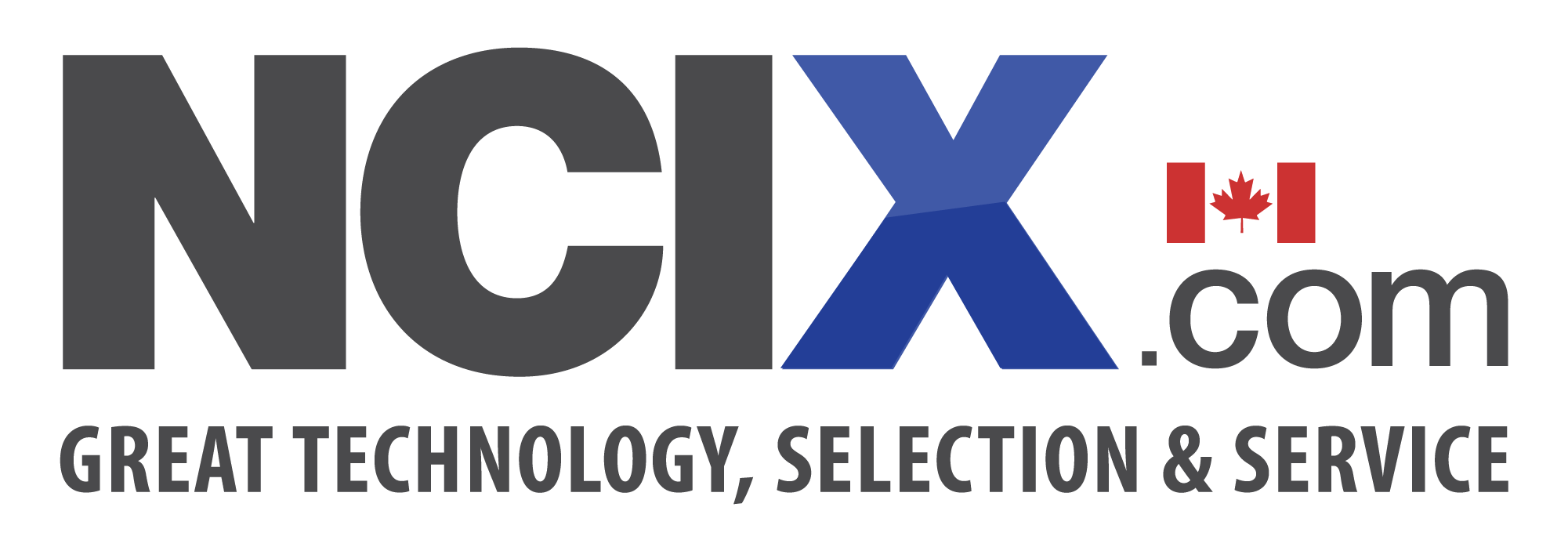
- Trade name: NCIX
- Type: Private
- Industry: Online retail sales
- Founded: April 28, 1996; 30 years ago
- Founder: Steve Wu
- Defunct: December 1, 2017
- Fate: Bankruptcy and liquidation
- Headquarters: Richmond, British Columbia, Canada
- Website: www.ncix.com at the Wayback Machine (archived September 20, 2018)

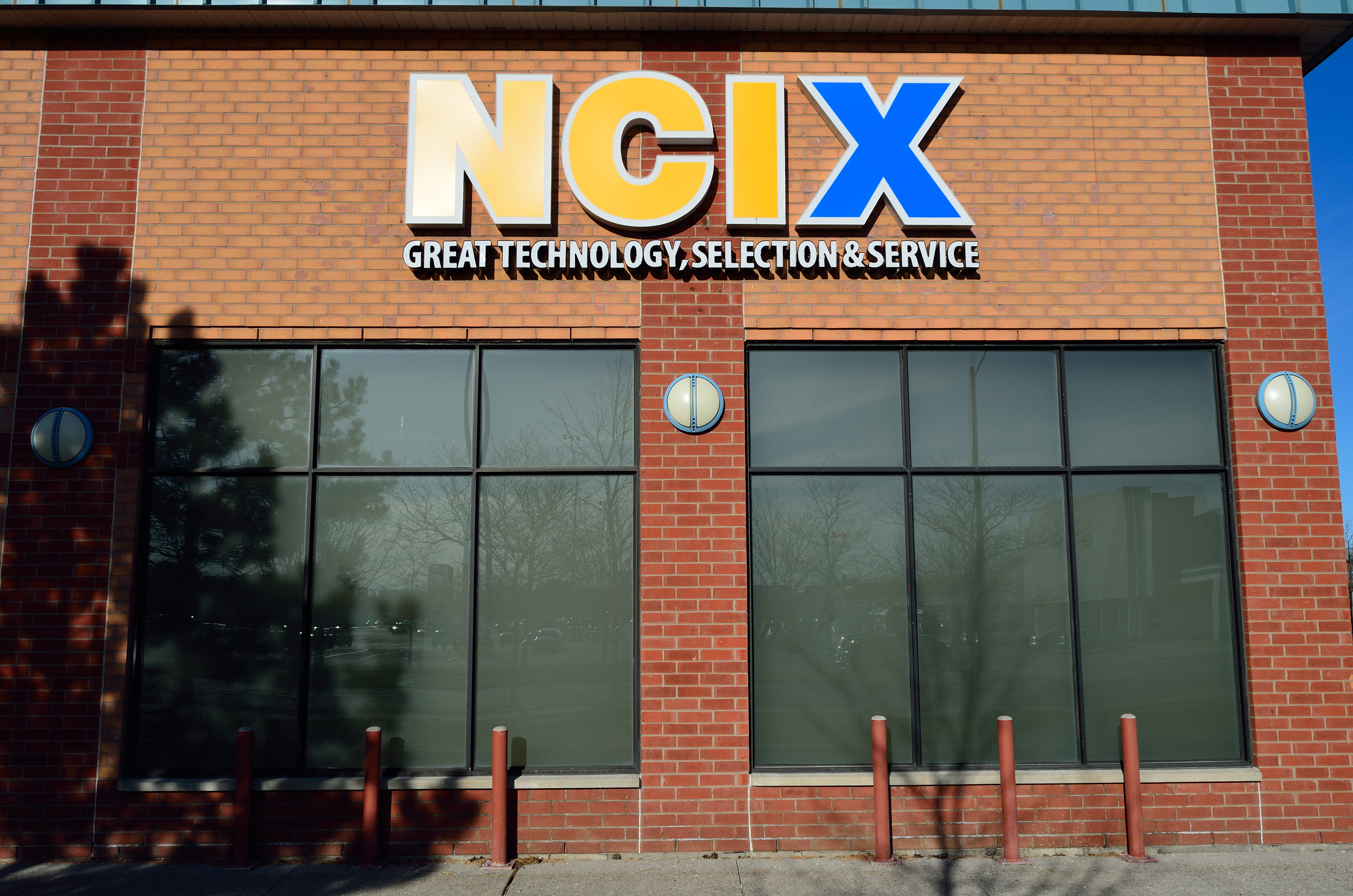
NCIX store in 2015

NCIX Computer Inc. (formerly known as Netlink Computer Inc.) was an online computer hardware and software retailer based in Richmond, British Columbia, Canada, founded in 1996 by Steve Wu (伍啟儀).

The company is notably tied to the early career of Linus Sebastian, a former employee who created the Linus Tech Tips YouTube channel during his tenure there. Sebastian initially worked at NCIX as a product manager and later created and presented the company’s YouTube channel, NCIX Tech Tips, to market its products.

== Outlets ==
It had retail outlets in Vancouver, Burnaby, Coquitlam, Richmond and Langley, British Columbia, as well as Markham, Mississauga, Scarborough, Toronto and Ottawa, Ontario. At one point, NCIX had 3 shipping facilities, one in Richmond, British Columbia, another in Markham, Ontario, and one in City of Industry, California.

By July 17, 2017, NCIX had closed the Mississauga, Toronto, and Ottawa retail locations. NCIX declared bankruptcy with the Supreme Court of British Columbia on December 1, 2017, and liquidated all stores and processing orders.

== Demise ==
As one of the few surviving PC retail chains in Canada, the company "invested heavily in large walk-in retail outlets… all of which were expensive to run", rather than further online sales assets to compete more effectively against Amazon and Newegg. Furthermore, the company prioritized "sales of individual computer parts over complete systems" at a time when consumers and "millennial gamers with relatively high disposable incomes" opted for built systems from trusted brands while "the number of hobbyists who want to build their own hardware is dwindling".

In July 2017, NCIX closed all their Ontario retail outlets in Ottawa, Mississauga, and Toronto and shortly after its Markham headquarters office.

In November 2017, NCIX closed its Vancouver, Burnaby, and Coquitlam stores. Canada Computers then announced they had taken over the leases on these locations.

On November 30, 2017, the last retail store located in Lansdowne Mall, Richmond closed, with only their headquarters in Richmond left.

On December 1, 2017, NCIX filed for bankruptcy with the Supreme Court of British Columbia, under File Number 170816.

=== Server data breach ===
On August 1, 2018, a Craigslist ad listed as “NCIX Database Servers - $8500 (Richmond BC)” was found by Travis Doering of Privacy Fly, indicating unerased servers and data from NCIX operations were available for sale containing user data dating back 15 years. Employee data, including social insurance numbers, was also leaked. Doering stated that in one database alone there were 3.8 million Canadians' information. The data was obtained from an abandoned warehouse where NCIX stored servers before their bankruptcy after the servers were sold to make up for the $150,000 rent fees owed to the owner of the warehouse. This prompted an investigation by the RCMP and Office of the Information and Privacy Commissioner of British Columbia, and the police seized the servers. Despite this, the data on the servers had been copied and sold multiple times before the servers were seized. Software engineer Kipling Warner since sued NCIX and their auctioneer for failing to properly protect the information.
