= Austin Evans (YouTuber) =

American YouTuber (born 1992)

- Born: August 22, 1992 (age 34); Missouri, U.S.
- Occupations: YouTuber; tech blogger; tech reviewer

YouTube information
- Channel: Austin Evans
- Years active: 2009–present
- Genres: Technology; review; tutorials; gaming
- Subscribers: 5.85 million
- Views: 1.76 billion
- Last updated: October 10, 2026

Austin Evans (born August 22, 1992) is an American YouTuber and tech blogger who creates videos on various modern technologies, such as video games, smartphones and personal computers. As of October 10, 2026, his YouTube channel has over 5.8 million subscribers and 1.7 billion views. Videos of his have been featured on technology sites such as The Verge, Eurogamer, Video Games Chronicle and Engadget.

== Early and personal life ==
Austin Evans was born on August 22, 1992, and is a Missouri native. Homeschooled throughout his childhood, Evans developed interests in video games and technology at an early age from his father buying the Sony PlayStation 1 for him and his family, along with discovering the Nintendo Game Boy. His interest in technology also extended towards personal computers, where he would browse for YouTube videos and write stories. In a Business Insider interview, Evans stated that "one of my earliest memories, when I was younger, was looking at an old PC at Goodwill and asking my mom to let me buy it just to tear it apart."

On January 29, 2014, Evans' apartment was burned down with many of his personal possessions, including his video equipment and custom-made PCs destroyed in the process. Tech YouTubers such as Jonathan Morrison, Lewis Hilsenteger and Marques Brownlee rallied together to surprise Evans with a new PC, recording his reaction in a vlog.

== Career ==
Evans created his YouTube channel in 2009, initially uploading reviews on numerous iPod Touch applications. He soon shifted to videos about computer components he would use in hypothetical PC setups, mainly discussing ideal builds rather than assembling them often. Evans credited his growth in popularity to a tutorial video on building a $500 PC that received hundreds of views; as he continued uploading videos, he invested more on PC components and soon created monthly videos on building PCs. Buying the majority of the equipment himself, Evans constructed affordable budget-based PCs with cheap parts. His content eventually evolved to include reviews of different tech along with other tech review series.

Evans' content primarily consists of technology reviews, both of the latest technology and of comparisons between old and new tech. Evans introduces the audience with the greeting "Hey guys, this is Austin," a catchphrase his fans have echoed in the comment section of his videos. His style of tech reviews has been compared to mockumentaries, also noted for its awkward yet lighthearted atmosphere and the banter amongst his crew members. Evans also emphasizes the importance of cinematography as a way to make effective videos. In 2016 he made a tutorial explaining his video process, including the manner in which he captures shots, the effects of equipment in crafting a video style, and cohesive editing tips as well.

Numerous tech reviews and videos of Evans' have been featured in various technology websites. In 2016, he created a video of him acquiring a $20 Android budget phone for comparison between other Android smartphones on the market; while noting its durability and basic functionalities he also lamented its sluggish performance. That same year, Evans made a similar comparison video between the contemporary iPhone 7 Plus and previous generation iPhone models; he later performed a similar benchmark test with the iPhone 12 Pro and smartphones such as the Galaxy Note 20 Ultra and the Google Pixel 5. In 2017 he appeared in a Slate interview discussing virtual reality headsets, recommending the HTC Vive along with alternatives such as the PlayStation VR.

In 2019, Evans built a custom-made PC with components similar to the PlayStation 5 in anticipation for the console's announcement. The components included an AMD Ryzen CPU, a Radeon graphics card, and 16 gigabytes of DDR4 RAM. Compared to the PlayStation 4 Pro which ran certain games in 1440p resolution at 30 Hz, the PC ran several games at 4K resolution at 60 Hz. The PC was also capable of running games at 8K resolution but with variable frame rates. In total the computer cost roughly $1,400 for the components and about an hour for Evans to build.

In 2020, Evans made an unboxing video on the DualSense controller, noticing the tiny grooves resembling the PlayStation symbols etched into the gamepad's body. He also tested the DualSense on other tech devices, discovering its compatibility with Android devices and PCs. American rapper Logic also guest-appeared in the video.

In 2021, Evans made a video review of a revised PlayStation 5 model which weighs roughly 300 grams (0.6 pounds) less than the original console, disassembling the new model to reveal that a smaller heatsink contributed to its lighter weight. After testing the external temperatures of the PS5, Evans noted that the new model ran at 3 to 5 degrees Celsius higher than the original version, and concluded that it was worse than the original as a result. Media outlets such as Eurogamer, Engadget and Kotaku reported on Evans' video, also verifying that the model's weight discrepancies corresponded to the changed heatsink. However, this led to speculation that Sony modified the build quality of the PS5 in order to decrease production costs. Digital Foundry, citing Evans' research, debunked the concerns that the PS5 model's heatsink affected the performance of the console, believing that it was of little concern. Evans later posted a video defending his arguments while clarifying his concerns with the new PS5 model. He also acknowledged Digital Foundry's findings, stating that he agreed with their article.

== Other work ==
In 2015, he appeared on a discussion podcast with The Verge.

== Reception ==
In 2015, Inc. Magazine listed Evans as one of the "Top 30 Power Players in Tech;" he ranked #12. In 2019, Evans was cited in The Washington Post as an example of a tech YouTuber one should subscribe to. He was also featured on a list of the best tech YouTubers by Engadget. Marques Brownlee and Linus Sebastian have stated that Evans is one of their favorite YouTubers.

== See also ==
- List of YouTubers
