= Chief visionary officer =

Executive function in a company

A chief visionary officer or chief vision officer (CVO) is an executive function in a company like a CEO or COO. The title is sometimes used to formalize a high-level advisory position and other times used to define a higher-ranking position than that held by the CEO. In some cases, the CVO is added to the CEO-title (for CEO/CVO status), much in the same way that people with multiple university degrees list them after their names.

== Role and function ==
The CVO is expected to have a broad and comprehensive knowledge of all matters related to the business of the organization, as well as the vision required to steer its course into the future. The person in charge must have the core-competencies of every executive, and the visionary ideas to move the company forward, defining corporate strategies and working plans.

The role has expanded to include formalizing the company’s strategic-planning processes, forging new working relationships and synergies across the organization, and establishing greater transparency and accountability for those people carrying out the company’s strategy.

Companies add CVOs to their management teams, or sometimes a Chief Strategy Officer (CSO), for different reasons :

- Changes to the business landscape;
- Complex organizational structures;
- Rapid globalization;
- New regulations;
- Need to innovate.

These reasons make it more difficult for CEOs to be on top of everything, even in areas as important as strategy execution and vision direction.

Strategy development has become a continuous process, and successful execution depends on rapid and effective decision-making. Further, as Harvard Business School professor Joseph L. Bower has noted: "Iron-fisted control of execution often eludes the top team’s grasp, as line executives seek to define strategy on their own terms."

== See also ==
- Chief executive officer (CEO)
- Chief financial officer (CFO)
- Chief operating officer (COO)
- Chief commercial officer (CCO)
- Chief marketing officer (CMO)
- Chief human resources officer (CHRO)
- Chief technology officer (CTO)
- Chief scientific officer (CSO)
- Chief innovation officer (CIO)
- Chief information officer (CIO)
- Chief strategy officer (CSO)
- Chief creative officer (CCO)
- Chief content officer (CCO)
