= GeForce RTX 30 series =

Series of GPUs by Nvidia

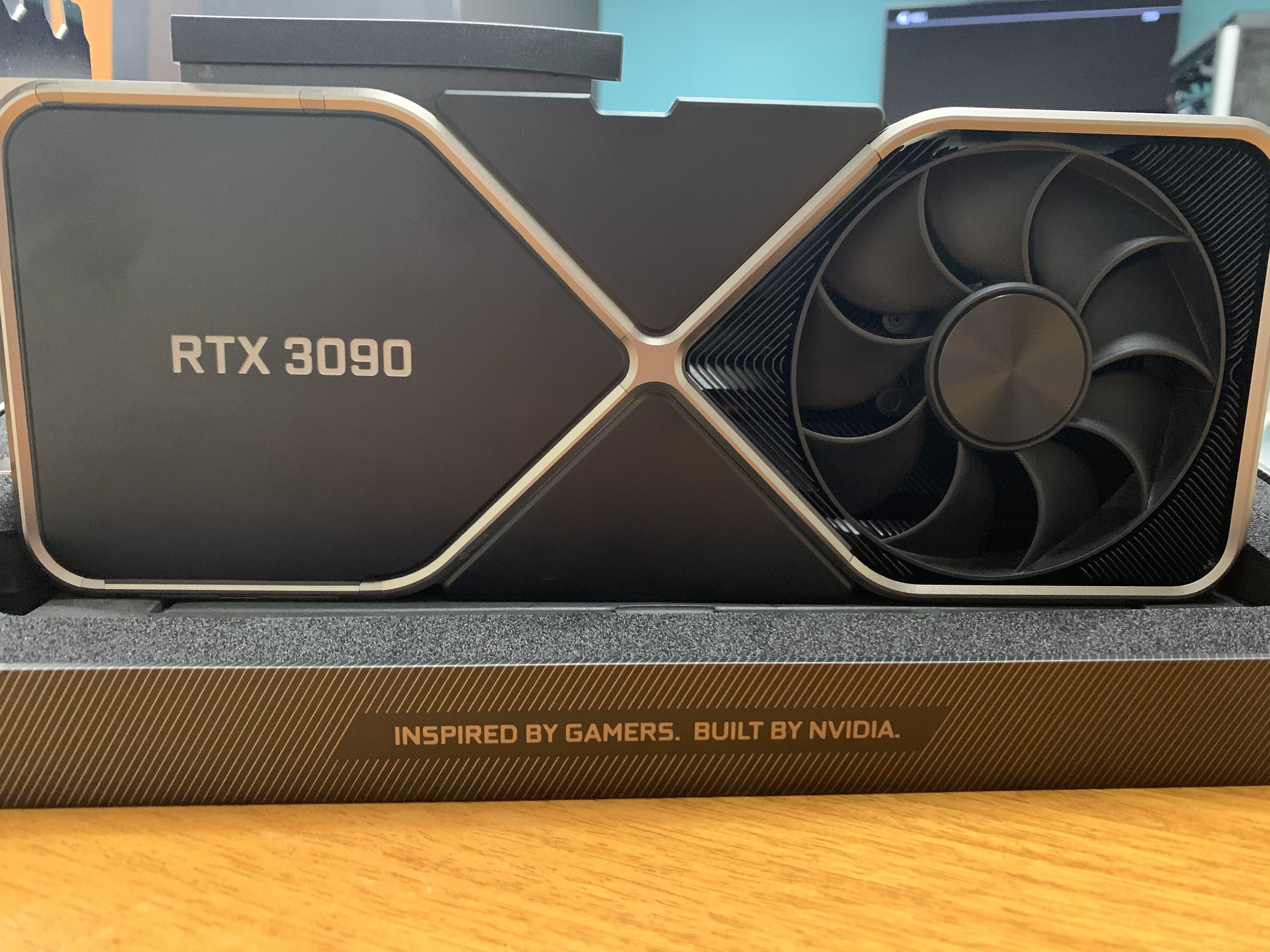
- Top: Logo of the series Bottom: A GeForce RTX 3090 Founders Edition released in 2020, the series' flagship model until the RTX 3090 Ti released in 2022
- Release date: September 17, 2020; 6 years ago
- Manufactured by: Samsung
- Designed by: Nvidia
- Marketed by: Nvidia
- Codename: GA10x
- Architecture: Ampere
- Models: GeForce RTX series
- Transistors: 8.7B (GA107); 13.25B (GA106); 17.4B (GA104); 22B (GA103); 28.3B (GA102)
- Fabrication process: Samsung 8LPH

Cards
- Entry-level: GeForce RTX 3050 (6 GB); GeForce RTX 3050 (8 GB); GeForce RTX 3050 Ti (laptop only); (4GB)
- Mid-range: GeForce RTX 3060 (8 GB); GeForce RTX 3060 (12 GB); GeForce RTX 3060 Ti; GeForce RTX 3060 Ti (GDDR6X); GeForce RTX 3070
- High-end: GeForce RTX 3070 Ti; GeForce RTX 3080; GeForce RTX 3080 (12 GB); GeForce RTX 3080 Ti
- Enthusiast: GeForce RTX 3090; GeForce RTX 3090 Ti

API support
- Direct3D: Direct3D 12.0 Ultimate (feature level 12_2); Shader Model 6.8
- OpenCL: OpenCL 3.0 (Note: In OpenCL 3.0, OpenCL 1.2 functionality has become a mandatory baseline, while all OpenCL 2.x and OpenCL 3.0 features were made optional.)
- OpenGL: OpenGL 4.6
- Vulkan: Vulkan 1.4

History
- Predecessor: GeForce GTX 16 series; GeForce RTX 20 series
- Successor: GeForce RTX 40 series

Support status
- Supported

The GeForce RTX 30 series is a suite of graphics processing units (GPUs) developed by Nvidia, succeeding the GeForce RTX 20 series. The GeForce RTX 30 series is based on the Ampere architecture, which features Nvidia's second-generation ray tracing (RT) cores and third-generation Tensor Cores. Part of the Nvidia RTX series, hardware-enabled real-time ray tracing is featured on GeForce RTX 30 series cards.

The lineup was designed to compete with AMD's Radeon RX 6000 series of cards. It consists of the entry-level (and previously laptop-exclusive) RTX 3050 and laptop-exclusive RTX 3050 Ti, the mid-range RTX 3060, the upper-midrange RTX 3060 Ti and RTX 3070, the high-end RTX 3070 Ti, RTX 3080 10GB, and RTX 3080 12GB, the laptop-exclusive RTX 3080 16GB, and the enthusiast-class RTX 3080 Ti, RTX 3090, and RTX 3090 Ti. This was the last generation from Nvidia to have official support for Windows 7, as the latest drivers for the current generation of cards require at least Windows 10 as of the time of writing.

The GeForce RTX 30 series began shipping on September 17, 2020. The initial launch, consisting of the RTX 3070, RTX 3080, and RTX 3090, occurred during the 2020–2023 global chip shortage, resulting in widespread and notable shortages of the series as a whole that lasted from the series' launch until 2022.

The GeForce RTX 30 series was succeeded by the GeForce RTX 40 series, powered by the Ada Lovelace microarchitecture, which first launched in 2022.

== Release and availability issues ==
Launch day for the RTX 3080 was September 17, 2020. The lack of pre-order functionality and high demand exacerbated by the COVID-19 pandemic, and boost in scalping, resulted in a large number of online retailers struggling with the sheer number of purchases. Newegg had completely sold out as expected on Black Friday. Long lines formed outside physical stores with stock, such as Micro Center in the United States, and Dospara in Japan. Twitter users reported that they used bots to buy large numbers of cards to resell for higher prices.

Nvidia released a statement the following day, apologizing for the difficulties with their online store, which went down on launch day due to high traffic. On October 2, Nvidia announced that it would delay the release of RTX 3070 cards by two weeks to guarantee availability. On October 5, Nvidia CEO Jensen Huang announced delays due to supply shortages, which were expected to go on until 2021. On October 9, the company announced that all Founder's Edition graphic cards in the United States would temporarily be sold via Best Buy, while the official web store would be upgraded to improve the shopping experience. In early December, Nvidia blamed continued component shortages on Samsung wafer shortages, resulting in chip shortages, among other factors.

Shortages of RTX 30 series cards continued throughout 2021 and well into 2022. In an effort to limit purchases by crypto miners, Nvidia announced in February that the RTX 3060 cards would be able to detect algorithms for mining of the Ethereum cryptocurrency and halve the hash rate. Shortly after release, Nvidia accidentally released a driver update which disabled the detection. In March, TechRadar reported that the shortages could continue until the third quarter of the year, in part blaming a global GDDR6 memory shortage and the cards' supply being bought out by cryptominers. In April, Hong Kong Customs and Excise seized 300 non-video CMP cards.

Nvidia officially announced new RTX 3080, RTX 3070, RTX 3060 Ti Limited Hash Rate (LHR) SKUs on May 18, 2021, which limits the Ethereum hash mining hash rate.

Nvidia released the RTX 3080 Ti on June 3, and the RTX 3070 Ti one week later, on June 10. Both included the cryptocurrency mining hash rate limiter.

There have been multiple attempts to meet the demand. EVGA introduced a system designed to put people into a queue, with the goal being to prevent cards from selling out quickly and decrease wait time.

Besides the Founders Edition, there are also a variety of aftermarket cards, referred to as "custom cards" by Nvidia. The graphics chip is taken from Nvidia and parts of the card are modified according to the company's specifications. Such modifications include: clock speeds, fans, heat sinks, connectors, and aesthetics. Such aftermarket cards tend to perform better than Nvidia's in-house cards, but the increased performance comes with tradeoffs in temperature and power consumption. Manufacturers include Gigabyte, MSI, ZOTAC, Asus, EVGA, and INNO3D.

Nvidia officially released the GeForce RTX 3080 12GB graphics card on January 11, 2022 and the desktop GeForce RTX 3050 graphics card on January 27, 2022. The RTX 3050 had previously only had a laptop variant that was launched on May 11, 2021, along with the laptop variant of the RTX 3050 Ti that currently still has no desktop variant. Nvidia officially released the GeForce RTX 3090 Ti on March 29, 2022.

== Details ==
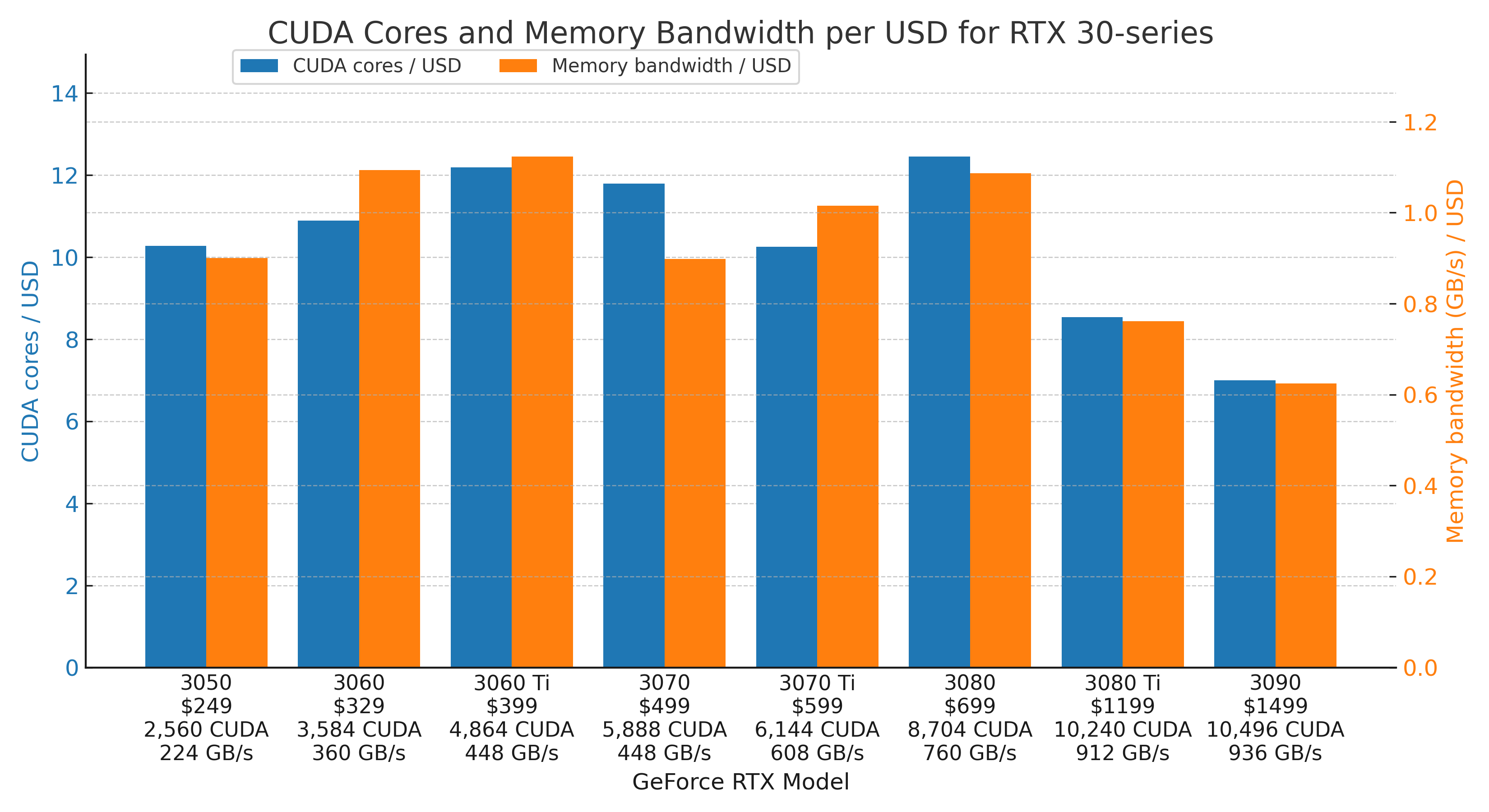
CUDA cores and memory bandwidth per USD for RTX 30-series GPUs

Architectural improvements of the Ampere architecture include the following:

- CUDA Compute Capability 8.6
- Samsung 8 nm 8N (8LPH) process (custom designed for Nvidia)
- Doubled FP32 performance per SM on Ampere GPUs
- Third-generation Tensor Cores with FP16, bfloat16, TensorFloat-32 (TF32) and sparsity acceleration
- Second-generation Ray Tracing Cores, plus concurrent ray tracing and shading and compute
- GDDR6X memory support (RTX 3060Ti GDDR6X Version, RTX 3070 Ti, RTX 3080, RTX 3080 12 GB, RTX 3080 Ti, RTX 3090, RTX 3090 Ti)
- PCI Express 4.0
- NVLink 3.0 (RTX 3090, RTX 3090 Ti)
- HDMI 2.1 supporting FRL6 (48 Gbit/s) transmission speed
- PureVideo Feature Set K hardware video decoding with AV1 hardware decoding

=== Desktop ===
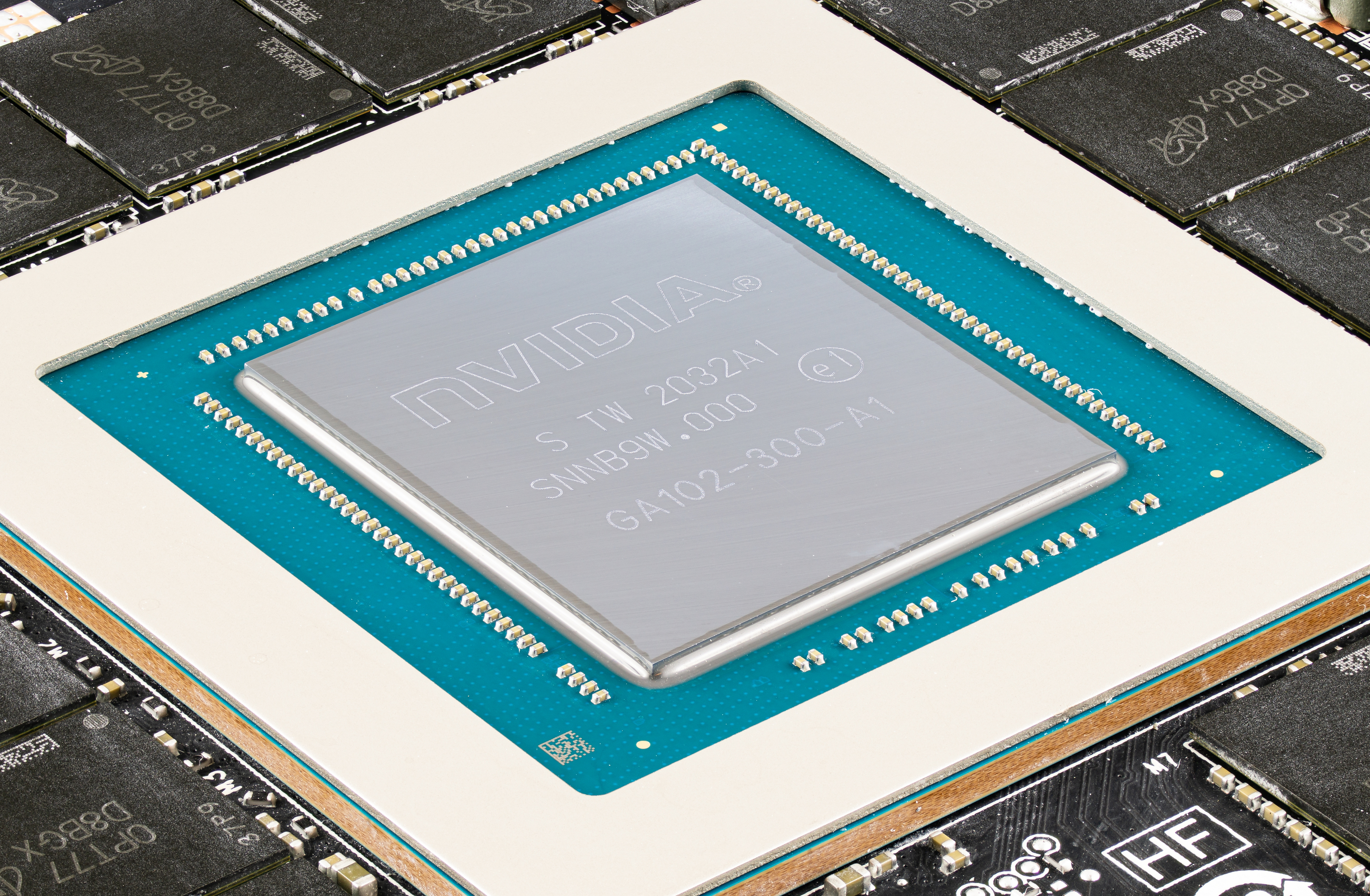
Close-up view of the die of a RTX 3090

- All the RTX 30 GPUs are made using the 8 nm Samsung node.
- Only the RTX 3090 and RTX 3090 Ti support 2-way NVLink.
- RTX 3050 feature limited 8 lanes for the PCIe 4.0 bus interface. All other cards support the full ×16 bandwidth.
- Double-precision (FP64) performance of the Ampere chips are 1/64 of single-precision (FP32) performance.

Model	Launch	Launch MSRP (USD)	Code name(s) (Note: Models with GA1xx-x02 chips feature improved Lite Hash Rate (LHR) limiter for cryptomining.)	Transistors (billion)	Die size (mm^{2})	Core config (Note: Shader Processors, Texture mapping units: Render output units: Ray tracing cores: Tensor Cores)	SM count (Note: The number of Streaming multi-processors on the GPU)	L2 cache (MB)	Clock speeds (Note: Core boost values (if available) are stated below the base value inside brackets.)		Fillrate (Note: Pixel fillrate is calculated as the number of render output units (ROPs) multiplied by the base (or boost) core clock speed.) (Note: Texture fillrate is calculated as the number of texture mapping units (TMUs) multiplied by the base (or boost) core clock speed.)		Memory				Processing power (TFLOPS) (Note: Precision performance is calculated from the base (or boost) core clock speed based on a FMA operation. Calculation for accumulated Tensor (FP16) computation is: Tensor Cores * core clock * 256 / 1000. When used with the sparsity feature, the ratio is 2:1.)				TDP (watts)
Model	Launch	Launch MSRP (USD)	Code name(s)	Transistors (billion)	Die size (mm^{2})	Core config	SM count	L2 cache (MB)	Core (MHz)	Memory (GT/s) (Note: Cards with GDDR6X send two bits per transfer. The transfer rate should not be confused with the bit rate.)	Pixel (Gpx/s)	Texture (Gtex/s)	Size (GB)	Band- width (GB/s)	Type	Bus width (bit)	Half (boost)	Single (boost)	Double (boost)	Tensor compute [sparse]	TDP (watts)
GeForce RTX 3050	Feb 2, 2024	169	GA107-325	8.7	200	2304; 72:32:18:72	18	2	1042 (1470)	14	33.34 (47.04)	75.02 (105.8)	6	168	GDDR6	96	4.802 (6.774)	4.802 (6.774)	0.075 (0.105)	30.1 [60.2]	70
GeForce RTX 3050	Dec 16, 2022	249	GA107-350	8.7	200	2560; 80:32:20:80	20	2	1552 (1777)	14	49.66 (56.86)	124.2 (142.2)	8	224	GDDR6	128	7.946 (9.098)	7.946 (9.098)	0.124 (0.142)	36.4 [72.8]	115
GeForce RTX 3050	Jul 18, 2022	OEM	GA106-150	13.25	276	2304; 72:32:18:72	18	2	1515 (1755)	14	48.48 (56.16)	109.1 (126.4)	8	224	GDDR6	128	6.981 (8.087)	6.981 (8.087)	0.109 (0.126)	32.4 [64.8]	130
GeForce RTX 3050	Jan 27, 2022	249	GA106-150	13.25	276	2560; 80:32:20:80	20	2	1552 (1777)	14	49.66 (56.86)	124.2 (142.2)	8	224	GDDR6	128	7.946 (9.098)	7.946 (9.098)	0.124 (0.142)	36.4 [72.8]	130
GeForce RTX 3060	Feb 25, 2021	329	GA106-300	13.25	276	3584; 112:48:28:112	28	3	1320 (1777)	15	63.36 (85.29)	147.8 (199)	12	360	GDDR6	192	9.462 (12.74)	9.462 (12.74)	0.148 (0.199)	51.2 [102.4]	170
GeForce RTX 3060	May 2021	329	GA106-302	13.25	276	3584; 112:48:28:112	28	3	1320 (1777)	15	63.36 (85.29)	147.8 (199)	12	360	GDDR6	192	9.462 (12.74)	9.462 (12.74)	0.148 (0.199)	51.2 [102.4]	170
GeForce RTX 3060	Oct 2022	329	GA106-302	13.25	276	3584; 112:48:28:112	28	2	1320 (1777)	15	63.36 (85.29)	147.8 (199)	8	224	GDDR6	128	9.462 (12.74)	9.462 (12.74)	0.148 (0.199)	51.2 [102.4]	170
GeForce RTX 3060	Sep 2021	329	GA104-150	17.4	392.5	3584; 112:48:28:112	28	3	1320 (1777)	15	63.36 (85.29)	147.8 (199)	12	360	GDDR6	192	9.462 (12.74)	9.462 (12.74)	0.148 (0.199)	51.2 [102.4]	170
GeForce RTX 3060 Ti	Dec 2, 2020	399	GA104-200	17.4	392.5	4864; 152:80:38:152	38	4	1410 (1665)	14	112.8 (133.2)	214.3 (253.1)	8	448	GDDR6	256	13.72 (16.2)	13.72 (16.2)	0.214 (0.253)	64.8 [129.6]	200
GeForce RTX 3060 Ti	May 2021	399	GA104-202	17.4	392.5	4864; 152:80:38:152	38	4	1410 (1665)	14	112.8 (133.2)	214.3 (253.1)	8	448	GDDR6	256	13.72 (16.2)	13.72 (16.2)	0.214 (0.253)	64.8 [129.6]	200
GeForce RTX 3060 Ti	Oct 2022	399	GA104-202	17.4	392.5	4864; 152:80:38:152	38	4	1410 (1665)	9.5	112.8 (133.2)	214.3 (253.1)	8	608	GDDR6X	256	13.72 (16.2)	13.72 (16.2)	0.214 (0.253)	64.8 [129.6]	200
GeForce RTX 3060 Ti	Feb 23, 2022	399	GA103-200	22	496	4864; 152:80:38:152	38	4	1410 (1665)	14	112.8 (133.2)	214.3 (253.1)	8	448	GDDR6	256	13.72 (16.2)	13.72 (16.2)	0.214 (0.253)	64.8 [129.6]	200
GeForce RTX 3070	Oct 29, 2020	499	GA104-300; GA104-302	17.4	392.5	5888; 184:96:46:184	46	4	1500 (1725)	14	144 (165.6)	276 (317.4)	8	448	GDDR6	256	17.66 (20.31)	17.66 (20.31)	0.276 (0.317)	81.3 [162.6]	220
GeForce RTX 3070 Ti	Jun 10, 2021	599	GA104-400	17.4	392.5	6144; 192:96:48:192	48	4	1580 (1770)	9.5	151.6 (169.9)	303.3 (339.8)	8	608	GDDR6X	256	19.42 (21.7)	19.42 (21.7)	0.303 (0.34)	87 [174]	290
GeForce RTX 3070 Ti	Oct 2022	599	GA102-150	28.3	628.4	6144; 192:96:48:192	48	4	1580 (1770)	9.5	151.6 (169.9)	303.3 (339.8)	8	608	GDDR6X	256	19.42 (21.7)	19.42 (21.7)	0.303 (0.34)	87 [174]	320
GeForce RTX 3080	Sep 17, 2020	699	GA102-200; GA102-202	28.3	628.4	8704; 272:96:68:272	68	5	1440 (1710)	9.5	138.2 (164.2)	391.7 (465.1)	10	760	GDDR6X	320	25.07 (29.77)	25.07 (29.77)	0.392 (0.465)	119 [238]	320
GeForce RTX 3080 (12 GB)	Jan 11, 2022	799	GA102-220	28.3	628.4	8960; 280:96:70:280	70	6	1260 (1710)	9.5	120.9 (164.2)	325.8 (478.8)	12	912	GDDR6X	384	22.58 (30.64)	22.58 (30.64)	0.353 (0.478)	122 [244]	350
GeForce RTX 3080 Ti	Jun 3, 2021	1,199	GA102-225	28.3	628.4	10240; 320:112:80:320	80	6	1365 (1665)	9.5	152.8 (186.5)	436.8 (532.8)	12	912	GDDR6X	384	27.96 (34.1)	27.96 (34.1)	0.437 (0.533)	136 [273]	350
GeForce RTX 3090	Sep 24, 2020	1,499	GA102-250; GA102-300	28.3	628.4	10496; 328:112:82:328	82	6	1395 (1695)	9.75	156.2 (189.8)	457.6 (556)	24	936	GDDR6X	384	29.28 (35.58)	29.28 (35.58)	0.458 (0.556)	142 [284]	350
GeForce RTX 3090 Ti	Mar 29, 2022	1,999	GA102-350	28.3	628.4	10752; 336:112:84:336	84	6	1560 (1860)	10.5	174.7 (208.3)	524.1 (625)	24	1008	GDDR6X	384	33.55 (39.99)	33.55 (39.99)	0.524 (0.625)	160 [320]	450

=== Laptop ===
- All mobile RTX 30 GPUs support fourth-generation Max-Q. The decision to enable Max-Q Technologies such as Dynamic Boost 2.0 and WhisperMode 2.0 on devices is handled by its manufacturer.
- All models feature GDDR6 memory.

Model	Launch	Code name(s)	Transistors (billion)	Die size (mm^{2})	Core config	SM count	L2 cache (MB)	Clock speeds (Note: Max-Q design values are also accounted inside the final clock rate value. For models with Max-Q technology, the effective speeds of memory transfer and bandwidth are stated below inside brackets.)		Fillrate		Memory			Processing power (TFLOPS)			TDP (watts)
Model	Launch	Code name(s)	Transistors (billion)	Die size (mm^{2})	Core config	SM count	L2 cache (MB)	Core (MHz)	Memory (GT/s)	Pixel (Gpx/s)	Texture (Gtex/s)	Size (GB)	Band- width (GB/s)	Bus width (bit)	Half (boost)	Single (boost)	Double (boost)	TDP (watts)
GeForce RTX 3050 Laptop	May 11, 2021	GA107 (GN20-P0)	8.7	200	2048; 64:32:16:64	16	2	712–1530 (1057–1740)	12	48.96 (55.68)	97.92 (111.4)	4	192	128	2.916 (4.329)	2.916 (4.329)	0.046 (0.067)	35–80
GeForce RTX 3050 Laptop	Jul 6, 2022	GA107 (GN20-P0-R)	8.7	200	2560; 80:32:20:80	20	2	712–1530 (1057–1740)	12			6	144	96				35–80
GeForce RTX 3050 Ti Laptop	May 11, 2021	GA107 (GN20-P1)	8.7	200	2560; 80:32:20:80	20	2	735–1463 (1035–1695)	12	46.82 (54.24)	117 (135.6)	4	192	128	3.763 (5.299)	3.763 (5.299)	0.059 (0.082)	35–80
GeForce RTX 3060 Laptop	Feb 25, 2021	GA106 (GN20-E3)	12	276	3840; 120:48:30:120	30	3	817–1387 (1283–1703)	14 (12)	66.58 (81.74)	166.4 (204.4)	6	336 (288)	192	6.912 (10.94)	6.912 (10.94)	0.108 (0.171)	60–115
GeForce RTX 3070 Laptop	Jan 12, 2021	GA104-770 (GN20-E5)	17.4	392	5120; 160:80:40:160	40	4	780–1215 (1290–1620)	14 (12)	97.2 (129.6)	194.4 (259.2)	8	448 (384)	256	11.36 (15.97)	11.36 (15.97)	0.178 (0.249)	80–125
GeForce RTX 3070 Ti Laptop	Feb 1, 2022	GA104 (GN20-E6)	17.4	392	5888; 184:96:46:184	46	4	510–1035 (1035–1485)	14 (12)	99.36 (142.6)	190.4 (273.2)	8	448 (384)	256	12.93 (14.62)	12.93 (14.62)	0.202 (0.228)	80–125
GeForce RTX 3080 Laptop	Jan 12, 2021	GA104-775 (GN20-E7)	17.4	392	6144; 192:96:48:192	48	4	780–1350 (1245–1710)	14 (12)	129.6 (164.2)	259.2 (328.3)	8; 16	448 (384)	256	13.64 (18.98)	13.64 (18.98)	0.213 (0.296)	80–150
GeForce RTX 3080 Ti Laptop	Feb 1, 2022	GA103 (GN20-E8)	22	496	7424; 232:96:58:232	58	4	585–1230 (1125–1590)	16 (12)	118.1 (152.6)	285.4 (368.9)	16	512 (384)	256	14.43 (18.71)	14.43 (18.71)	0.225 (0.292)	80–150

== Reception ==
=== RTX 3090 Ti ===
According to TechRadar, "the Nvidia GeForce RTX 3090 Ti is an incredibly powerful graphics card". However, the problem would be that the RTX 3090 offers similar performance while "it costs significantly less." In addition to its price, they criticized the RTX 3090 Ti's high power consumption. The performance was praised, as the 3090 Ti "will likely be the go-to GPU for creative professionals that need brute force in their day-to-day work." In gaming, "the RTX 3090 Ti fares quite a bit better" compared to the RTX 3090, and even in 8K "will be able to hit a solid 60 fps in many games at high settings."

=== RTX 3090 ===
PC Gamer described the Nvidia GeForce RTX 3090 as a "frankly enormous graphics card", which is "supremely powerful" and "more worthy of its Titan credentials than the GeForce branding", as for the average gamer "it doesn't deliver enough over the RTX 3080 to make sense, but for the pro-creator it's a workload-crushing card."

=== RTX 3080 ===
GamesRadar praised the RTX 3080 for its capability to "run almost any game at 4K60fps with ray tracing" and found that it offers "4K gaming at an accessible price for the first time ever". According to The Verge, "4K gaming arrived with the RTX 2080 Ti", but "the RTX 3080 does the same and more at a much more affordable price point." Overall, the RTX 3080 would be "great for 1440p or 4K gaming"; however, they criticized the requirement of a 750W power supply as well as the 10GB of VRAM regarding future games.

=== RTX 3070 ===
Jim McGregor from Forbes found that "the RTX 3070 is the perfect solution for the more mainstream gamer", while "the competitive gamer or high-end creator will still likely opt for the GeForce RTX 3080 or RTX 3090."

== Support ==
Nvidia transitioned driver support for the Windows 7 operating system to legacy status and stopped issuing new security drivers for this operating system in September 2024. The RTX 30 series is the last Nvidia GPU architecture to support the Windows 7 operating system; the RTX 40 and later series of GPUs require Windows 10 or later.

== See also ==
- GeForce GTX 10 series
- GeForce RTX 50 series
- Quadro
- Nvidia Tesla
- List of Nvidia graphics processing units
