= GeForce RTX 40 series =

Series of GPUs by Nvidia

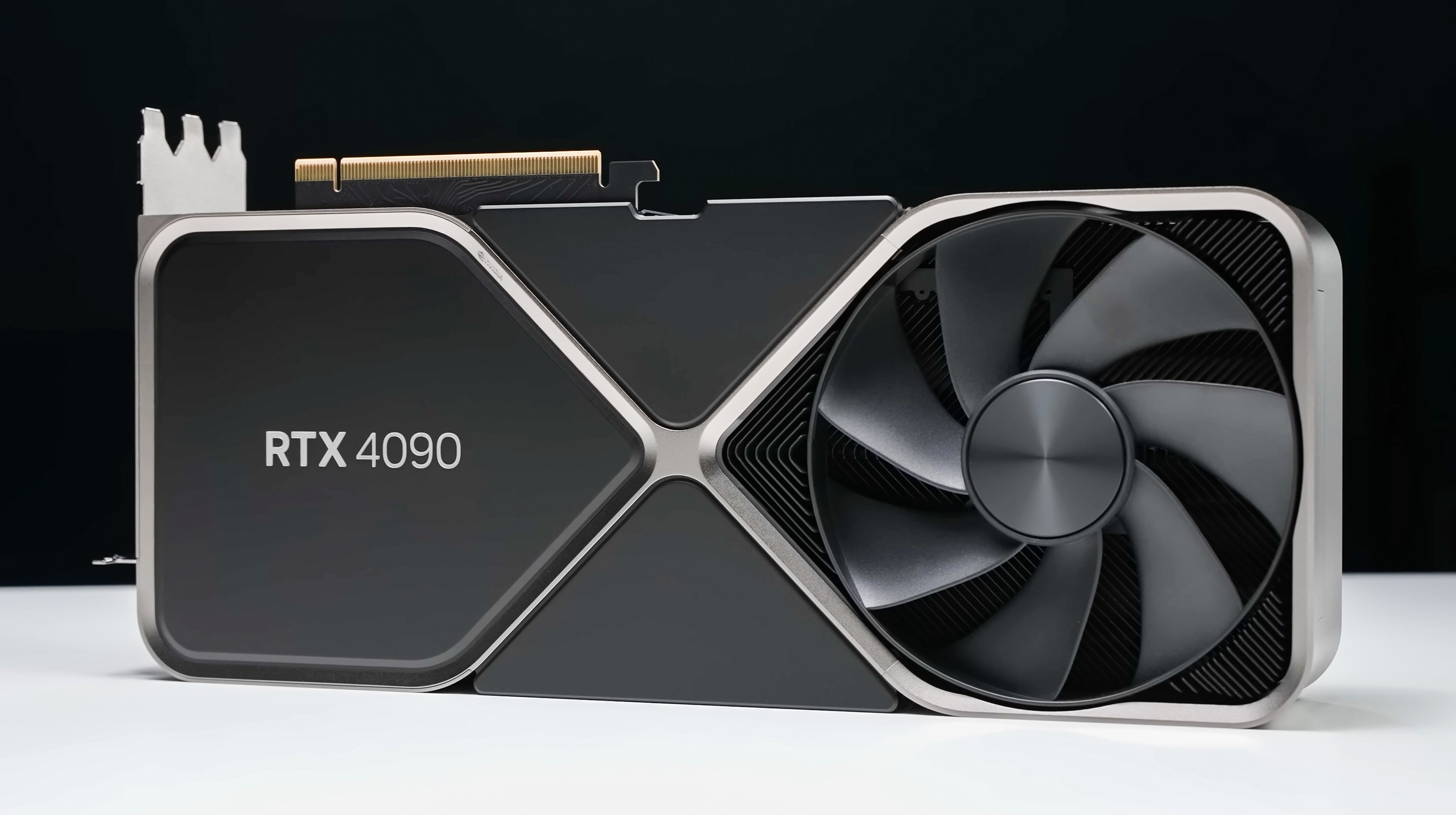
- A GeForce RTX 4090 Founders Edition released in 2022, the series' flagship model
- Release date: October 12, 2022; 4 years ago; January 17, 2024; 2 years ago (Super refresh)
- Manufactured by: TSMC
- Designed by: Nvidia
- Marketed by: Nvidia
- Codename: AD10x
- Architecture: Ada Lovelace
- Models: GeForce RTX series
- Cores: 20–128 Streaming Multiprocessors (2560–16384 CUDA cores)
- Transistors: 18.9B (AD107); 22.9B (AD106); 35.8B (AD104); 45.9B (AD103); 76.3B (AD102)
- Fabrication process: TSMC 4N

Cards
- Entry-level: GeForce RTX 4050 (laptop only); GeForce RTX 4060
- Mid-range: GeForce RTX 4060 Ti; GeForce RTX 4070; GeForce RTX 4070 Super; GeForce RTX 4070 Ti
- High-end: GeForce RTX 4070 Ti Super; GeForce RTX 4080; GeForce RTX 4080 Super
- Enthusiast: GeForce RTX 4090

API support
- OpenCL: OpenCL 3.0 (Note: In OpenCL 3.0, OpenCL 1.2 functionality has become a mandatory baseline, while all OpenCL 2.x and OpenCL 3.0 features were made optional.)
- OpenGL: OpenGL 4.6
- Vulkan: Vulkan 1.4
- DirectX: Direct3D 12.0 Ultimate (feature level 12_2); Shader Model 6.8

History
- Predecessor: GeForce RTX 30 series
- Successor: GeForce RTX 50 series

Support status
- Supported

The GeForce RTX 40 series is a family of consumer graphics processing units (GPUs) in Nvidia's GeForce line of graphics cards, succeeding the GeForce RTX 30 series. The series was announced on September 20, 2022, at the GPU Technology Conference, and launched on October 12, 2022, starting with its flagship model, the RTX 4090. It was succeeded by the GeForce RTX 50 series, which debuted on January 30, 2025, after being previously announced at CES.

The cards are based on Nvidia's Ada Lovelace architecture and feature Nvidia RTX's third-generation RT cores for hardware-accelerated real-time ray tracing, and fourth-generation deep-learning-focused Tensor Cores.

== Architecture ==
Architectural highlights of the Ada Lovelace architecture include the following:

- CUDA Compute Capability 8.9
- TSMC 4N process (5 nm custom designed for Nvidia) – not to be confused with N4
- Fourth-generation Tensor Cores with FP8, FP16, bfloat16, TensorFloat-32 (TF32) and sparsity acceleration
- Third-generation Ray Tracing Cores, along with concurrent ray tracing, shading and compute
- Shader Execution Reordering – needs to be enabled by the developer
- Dual NVENC with 8K 10-bit 120FPS AV1 fixed function hardware encoding
- A new generation of Optical Flow Accelerator to aid DLSS 3.0 intermediate AI-based frame generation
- No NVLink support
- DisplayPort 1.4a and HDMI 2.1 display connections
- Double-precision (FP64) performance of Ada Lovelace silicon is 1/64 of single-precision (FP32) performance.
- Eighth-generation NVENC encoder and fifth-generation NVDEC video decoder, with high-end cards using 2 encoders.

== Release ==
The RTX 4090 was released as the first model of the series on October 12, 2022, for $1,599 US, and the 16GB RTX 4080 was released on November 16, 2022, for $1,199 US. An RTX 4080 12GB was announced in September 2022, originally to be priced at $899 US, however following some controversy in the media it was "unlaunched" by Nvidia. On January 5, 2023, that model was released as the RTX 4070 Ti for $799 US. The RTX 4070 was then released on April 13, 2023 at $599 US MSRP. The RTX 4060 Ti was released on May 24, 2023, at $399 US, and the RTX 4060 on June 29, 2023, at $299 US. An RTX 4060 Ti 16GB followed on July 18, 2023, at $499 US. On January 8, 2024, Nvidia released the RTX 4070 Super at $599, RTX 4070 Ti Super at $799 and RTX 4080 Super at $999. These video cards were launched at higher specs and lower prices than their original counterparts. In the same vein, the production of the RTX 4080 and RTX 4070 Ti have stopped due to the Super series, but the 4070 will remain. In August 2024, Nvidia, citing the need "to improve supply and availability", introduced a variant of the RTX 4070 card with GDDR6 running at 20Gbps while all the other specs remain the same.

== Reception ==
=== RTX 4090 ===
Upon release, the RTX 4090's performance received praise from reviewers, with Tom's Hardware saying "it now ranks among the best graphics cards". A review by PC Gamer gave it 83/100, calling it "a hell of an introduction to the sort of extreme performance Ada can deliver when given a long leash". Tom Warren in a review for The Verge said that the RTX 4090 is "a beast of a graphics card that marks a new era for PC gaming". John Loeffler from GamesRadar wrote that the RTX 4090 offers "an incredible gen-on-gen performance improvement over the RTX 3090", "even putting the Nvidia GeForce RTX 3090 Ti to shame" and being "too powerful for a lot of gamers to really take advantage of". German online magazine golem.de described the RTX 4090 as the first GPU capable of native 4K gaming with ray tracing, as with the predecessor "one often preferred to forego ray tracing in favor of native resolution, especially in 4K." Aside from gaming performance, PCWorld's review highlighted the RTX 4090's benefits for content creators and streamers with its 24GB VRAM and AV1 encoding ability and was positive towards the Founders Edition's quiet operation and cooling ability. According to Joanna Nelius from USA Today, "The RTX 4090 drives such high frame rates that it would be a waste to have anything other than a 4K monitor, especially one with a refresh rate under 144Hz."

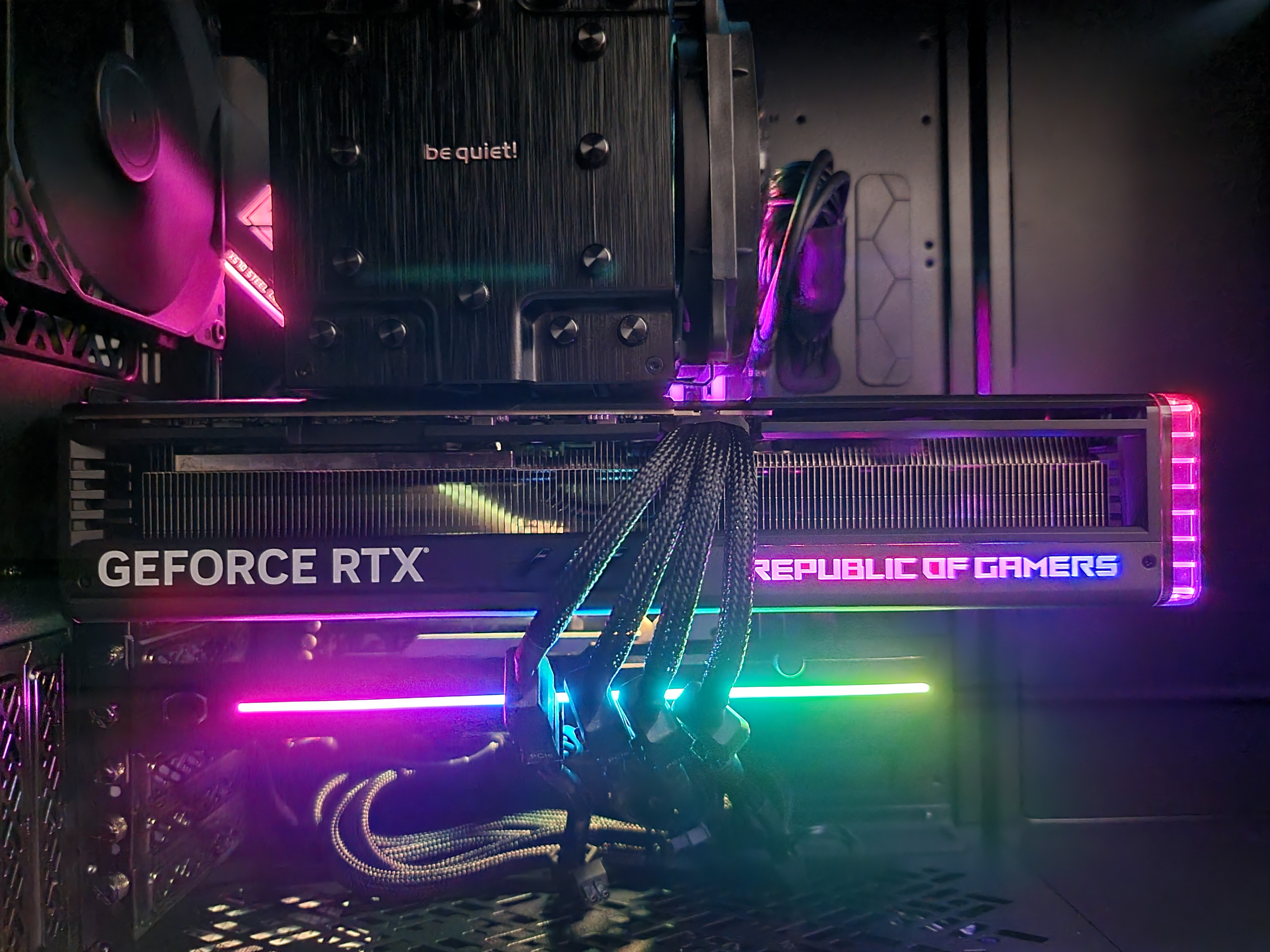
An Nvidia GeForce RTX 4090 (ASUS ROG STRIX Edition) within a PC

However, it also received criticism for its value proposition given that it begins at $1,599. Analysis by TechSpot found that the RTX 4090's value at 1440p was worse than the RTX 3090 Ti and that the RTX 4090 did not make much sense for 1440p as it was limited by CPU bottlenecks. Power consumption was another point of criticism for the RTX 4090. The RTX 4090 has a TDP of 450W compared to the 350W of its last generation equivalent. However, Jarred Walton of Tom's Hardware noted that the RTX 4090 has the same 450W TDP as the RTX 3090 Ti while delivering much higher performance with that power consumption.

Aftermarket AIB RTX 4090 variants received criticism in particular for their massive cooler sizes with some models being 4 PCIe slots tall. This made it difficult to fit an RTX 4090 into many mainstream PC cases. YouTube reviewer JayzTwoCents showed an Asus ROG Strix RTX 4090 model being comparable in size to an entire PlayStation 5 console. Another comparison showed Nvidia's RTX 4090 Founders Edition next to the Xbox Series X for size. It was theorized that a reason for the massive coolers on some models is that the RTX 4090 was originally designed to have a TDP up to 600W before it was reduced to its official 450W TDP.

=== RTX 4080 ===
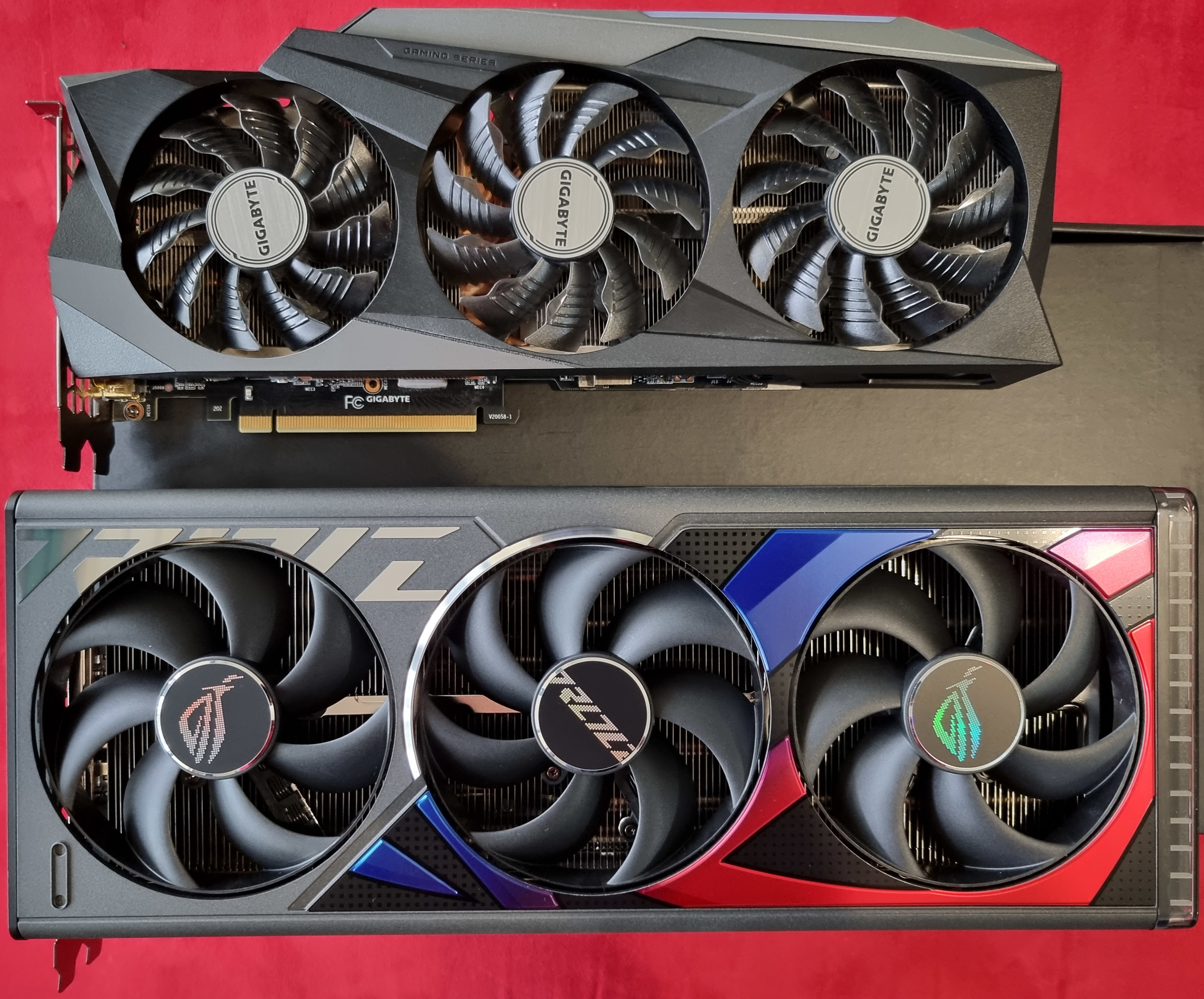
An aftermarket AIB variant of the RTX 4090 (Asus ROG Strix) on the bottom, next to an RTX 3090 (Gigabyte Gaming OC) for size comparison

The RTX 4080 received more mixed reviews when compared to the RTX 4090. TechSpot gave the RTX 4080 score of 80/100. Antony Leather of Forbes found that the RTX 4080 consistently performed better than the RTX 3090 Ti. The GPU's power efficiency was positively received with Digital Trends finding that the GPU had an average power draw of 271W despite its rated 320W TDP.

The RTX 4080's $1199 price received criticism for its dramatic increase from that of the RTX 3080. In his review for RockPaperShotgun, James Archer wrote that the RTX 4080 "produces sizeable gains on the RTX 3080, though they're not exactly proportional to the price rise". In another critique, RockPaperShotgun highlighted that AIB models can significantly exceed the base $1199 Founders Edition price, creating further value considerations. The Asus ROG Strix AIB model they reviewed came in at $1550 which is $50 less than the RTX 4090 Founders Edition. Tom Warren of The Verge recommended waiting to see what AMD could deliver in performance and value with their RDNA 3 GPUs. AMD's direct competitor, the Radeon RX 7900 XTX, comes in at $999 compared to the $1199 price of the RTX 4080.

The RTX 4080 received criticism for reusing the RTX 4090's massive 4-slot coolers which are not required to cool the RTX 4080's 320W TDP. A smaller cooler would have been sufficient. The RTX 3080 and RTX 3080 Ti with their respective 320W and 350W TDPs maintained 2-slot coolers while the 320W RTX 4080 has a 3-slot cooler on the Founders Edition and 4-slots on many AIB models.

It was reported that RTX 4080 sales were quite weak compared to the RTX 4090, which had shockingly sold out during its launch a month earlier. The global cost of living crisis and the RTX 4080's generational pricing increase have been suggested as major contributing factors for poor sales numbers.

=== RTX 4070 Ti ===
Following its relaunch as the RTX 4070 Ti, the GPU received mixed reviews. While its good thermal, 1080p, and 1440p performance were praised, its 4K performance is considered weak for the high $800 price tag.

Jacob Roach from Digital Trends gave the RTX 4070 Ti a 6/10, criticizing the lower memory bandwidth compared to the RTX 4080, its worse 4K performance, and the lack of a Founder's Edition model, with fears that the board partner cards would sell for over the $800 price tag, although he did praise the thermal performance and efficiency of his unit.

Michael Justin Allen Sexton from PCMag reviewed the ZOTAC RTX 4070 Ti Amp Extreme Airo model, giving it a 3.5/5, criticizing the large size of the card and it being only $100 less than AMD's direct competitor, the Radeon RX 7900 XT, which comes in at $899 compared to the $799 price of the RTX 4070 Ti.

It was reported that RTX 4070 Ti sales were quite weak, similar to the RTX 4080 at launch.

=== RTX 4070 ===
At launch, Jacob Roach from Digital Trends gave the RTX 4070 a 4.5/5, praising its efficiency, the fact the Founder's Edition only took up two slots, and its good GPU performance at 1440p and 4K. However, following the launch of the AMD Radeon RX 7800 XT, AMD's direct competitor to the RTX 4070, Monica J. White from Digital Trends compared the latter to the RTX 4070, and said she would recommend the 7800 XT over the RTX 4070 because of better rasterization performance at 1440p, the fact that the 7800 XT had 16GB of VRAM compared to 12GB on the RTX 4070, and that the 7800 XT had a $100 cheaper price.

After the launch of AMD's Radeon RX 7800 XT, the direct competitor to the RTX 4070, which was released on September 6, 2023, the price of some RTX 4070 cards was lowered to $550 and the official MSRP was lowered to $550 following the launch of the Super series.

=== RTX 4060 Ti (8 and 16 GB version) ===
The RTX 4060 Ti 8GB released in late May 2023. Many reviewers and customers denounced Nvidia for the lack of appropriate video memory for the release of the card, pointing that the RTX 3060 of the previous generation was released with 12GB of VRAM. Furthermore, many reviews mentioned that an 8GB card was simply not enough for modern standards, for example Digital Trends saying "It makes sense for the upcoming RTX 4060, which is launching in July with 8GB of VRAM for $300, but not for the $400 RTX 4060 Ti. At this price and performance, it should have 16GB of memory, or at the very least, a larger bus size." A few weeks later, prompted by consumers backlash, Nvidia announced they would release the RTX 4060 Ti 16GB in July 2023.

Despite that, the release of the 16GB variant itself was met with suspicion. Nvidia did not send samples for review, including to big names such as Gamers Nexus, Hardware Unboxed, and Linus Tech Tips. It was also later found out that AIBs were also prevented, presumably by Nvidia, to be allowed to give cards out for reviews. According to Gamesradar: "Coming in at $499, the Nvidia RTX 4060 Ti 16GB is arguably a hard sell. Normally, we'd test whether the GPU offers bang for buck, but it looks like reviews aren't going to be a thing. In a way, that sort of makes sense, as it should perform fairly similarly to the existing 8GB model, with the added benefit of more VRAM."

YouTube reviewers Hardware Unboxed criticized both models of the RTX 4060 Ti, calling the 8GB of VRAM model "laughably bad at $400" and "frankly, we don't even need to test the RTX 4060 Ti 8GB to tell you it's a disgustingly poor value product...". They criticized its 8GB of VRAM, which led to poor 1% low frame rates at 1080p and unusable 1% low frame rates at 1440p in games such as The Last of Us Part I and The Callisto Protocol both using the ultra quality preset. A Plague Tale: Requiem was also unusable at 1080p not only using the ultra quality preset with ray tracing enabled, but using the high quality preset with ray tracing enabled as it suffered similar unusable 1% low performance. While Halo Infinite and Forspoken did not have poor 1% low performance at 1080p, they instead sometimes failed to load textures with the 8GB RTX 4060 Ti due to a lack of VRAM. These were not an issue with the 16GB RTX 4060 Ti, however, the 16GB RTX 4060 Ti was criticized for costing $500 to "fix" the issues with running out of VRAM, which was $100 more than the 8GB RTX 4060 Ti for otherwise identical performance outside of VRAM limitations.

=== RTX 4060 ===
Jacob Roach from Digital Trends gave the RTX 4060 a 3/5, criticizing the poor performance of the GPU for the price, its low 8GB of VRAM capacity, the slow memory interface, and its performance at 1440p, although its efficiency was praised. He stated: "In the past, the RTX 4060 would have been classified as a workhorse GPU... The RTX 4060 falls short of filling that post, offering solid generational improvements but middling competitive performance, and relying on DLSS 3 and ray tracing to find its value."

== Products ==
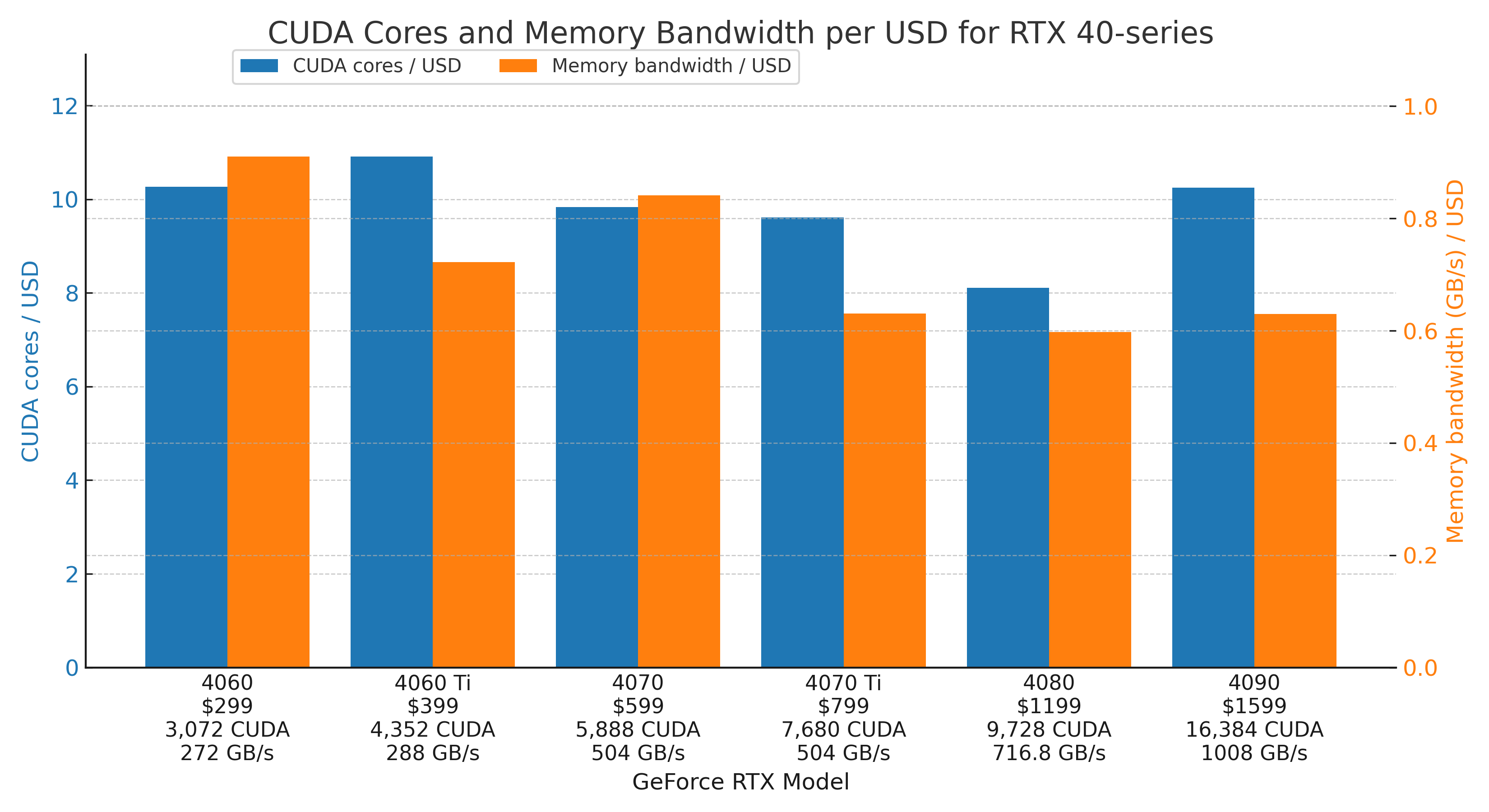
CUDA cores and memory bandwidth per USD for RTX 40-series GPUs

=== Desktop ===
- RTX 4060 and RTX 4060 Ti, as well as a later revision of the RTX 4070, use GDDR6 video memory. All other cards use GDDR6X video memory manufactured by Micron.
- RTX 4060 and RTX 4060 Ti have a limited 8 lane PCI Express 4.0 bus interface. All other cards support the full 16 lanes.
- There is a slower (on average 1% slower according to a single review so far) variant of the RTX 4070 with 20Gbps GDDR6 VRAM introduced in August 2024. All the other specs are identical.

Model	Launch	Launch MSRP (USD)	Code name(s)	Transistors (billion)	Die size (mm^{2})	Core config (Note: Shader processors: texture mapping units: render output units: ray tracing cores: Tensor Cores)	SM count (Note: The number of Streaming multi-processors on the GPU.)	L2 cache (MB)	Clock speeds (Note: Core boost values (if available) are stated below the base value inside brackets.)		Fillrate (Note: Pixel fillrate is calculated as the number of render output units (ROPs) multiplied by the base (or boost) core clock speed.) (Note: Texture fillrate is calculated as the number of texture mapping units (TMUs) multiplied by the base (or boost) core clock speed.)		Memory			Processing power (TFLOPS)			TDP
Model	Launch	Launch MSRP (USD)	Code name(s)	Transistors (billion)	Die size (mm^{2})	Core config	SM count	L2 cache (MB)	Core clock (MHz)	Memory (Gb/s)	Pixel (Gpx/s)	Texture (Gtex/s)	Size (GB)	Band- width (GB/s)	Bus width (bit)	FP16/FP32/ (boost)	FP64 (boost)	Tensor compute (sparse)	TDP
GeForce RTX 4060	Jun 29, 2023	299	AD107-400	18.9	146	3072; 96:48:24:96	24	24	1830 (2460)	17	58.6 (78.7)	175.7 (236.2)	8	272	128	11.24 (15.11)	0.176 (0.236)		115 W
GeForce RTX 4060 Ti	May 24, 2023	399	AD106-350	22.9	190	4352; 136:48:34:136	34	32	2310 (2540)	18	110.8 (121.7)	314.2 (344.8)	8	288	128	20.11 (22.06)	0.314 (0.345)		160 W
GeForce RTX 4060 Ti	Jul 18, 2023	499	AD106-351	22.9	190	4352; 136:48:34:136	34	32	2310 (2540)	18	110.8 (121.7)	314.2 (344.8)	16	288	128	20.11 (22.06)	0.314 (0.345)		165 W
GeForce RTX 4070	Apr 13, 2023	599	AD104-250	35.8	294.5	5888; 184:64:46:184	46	36	1920 (2475)	21	122.9 (158.4)	353.3 (455.4)	12	504	192	22.61 (29.15)	0.353 (0.455)	116.8 [233.6]	200 W
GeForce RTX 4070 Super	Jan 17, 2024	599	AD104-350	35.8	294.5	7168; 224:80:56:224	56	48	1980 (2475)	21	158.4 (198)	443.5 (554.4)	12	504	192	28.39 (35.48)	0.444 (0.554)		220 W
GeForce RTX 4070 Ti	Jan 5, 2023	799	AD104-400	35.8	294.5	7680; 240:80:60:240	60	48	2310 (2610)	21	184.8 (208.8)	554.4 (626.4)	12	504	192	35.48 (40.09)	0.554 (0.626)	160.4 [320.8]	285 W
GeForce RTX 4070 Ti Super	Jan 24, 2024	799	AD103-275	45.9	378.6	8448; 264:96:66:264	66	48	2340 (2610)	21	224.6 (292.3)	617.8 (689)	16	672	256	39.54 (44.1)	0.618 (0.689)		285 W
GeForce RTX 4080 (12 GB)	Unlaunched	899	AD104-400	35.8	294.5	7680; 240:80:60:240	60	48	2310 (2610)	21	184.8 (208.8)	554.4 (626.4)	12	504.2	192	35.48 (40.09)	0.554 (0.626)	160.4 [320.8]	285 W
GeForce RTX 4080	Nov 16, 2022	1,199	AD103-300	45.9	378.6	9728; 304:112:76:304	76	64	2210 (2505)	22.4	247.5 (280.6)	671.8 (761.5)	16	716.8	256	42.99 (48.74)	0.672 (0.762)	194.9 [389.8]	320 W
GeForce RTX 4080 Super	Jan 31, 2024	999	AD103-400	45.9	378.6	10240; 320:112:80:320	80	64	2205 (2550)	23	246.9 (280.6)	705.6 (801.6)	16	736	256	45.16 (51.3)	0.706 (0.802)		320 W
GeForce RTX 4090 D	Dec 28, 2023 (China only)	¥12,999 ($1,835)	AD102-250	76.3	608.5	14592; 456:176:114:456	114	72	2280 (2520)	21	401.2 (443.5)	1,040 (1,149)	24	1008	384	66.54 (73.54)	1.040 (1.149)		425 W
GeForce RTX 4090	Oct 12, 2022	1,599	AD102-300	76.3	608.5	16384; 512:176:128:512	128	72	2230 (2520)	21	392.5 (443.5)	1,142 (1,290)	24	1008	384	73.07 (82.58)	1.142 (1.290)	330.3 [660.6]	450 W
TITAN ADA	Never released	-	AD102-450	76.3	608.5	18432; 576:192:144:576	144		2230 (2520)	21	428.2 (483.8)	1,284 (1,415)	48	1008	384	82.21 (92.9)	1.284 (1.415)		

=== Mobile ===
- All SKUs feature GDDR6 memory.

Model	Launch	Code name(s)	Transistors (billion)	Die size (mm^{2})	Core config	SM count	L2 cache (MB)	Clock speeds		Memory			TDP
Model	Launch	Code name(s)	Transistors (billion)	Die size (mm^{2})	Core config	SM count	L2 cache (MB)	Core clock (MHz)	Memory (Gb/s)	Size (GB)	Band- width (GB/s)	Bus width (bit)	TDP
GeForce RTX 4050 Laptop	Feb 22, 2023	AD107 (GN21-X2)	18.9	156	2560; 80:32:20:80	20	12	1140–2370 (1605–2370)	16	6	192	96	35–115 W
GeForce RTX 4060 Laptop		AD107 (GN21-X4)			3072; 96:32:24:96	24	32	1140–2295 (1470–2370)		8	256	128	
GeForce RTX 4070 Laptop		AD106 (GN21-X6)	22.9	186	4608; 144:48:36:144	36	32	735–2070 (1230–2175)		8	256	128	
GeForce RTX 4080 Laptop	Feb 8, 2023	AD104 (GN21-X9)	35.8	294.5	7424; 232:80:58:232	58	48	795–1860 (1350–2280)	18	12	432	192	60–150 W
GeForce RTX 4090 Laptop	Feb 8, 2023	AD103 (GN21-X11)	45.9	378.6	9728; 304:112:76:304	76	64	930–1620 (1455–2040)	18	16	576	256	80–150 W

== Controversies ==
=== RTX 4080 12GB ===
When the 12GB variant of the RTX 4080 was announced, numerous publications, prominent YouTubers, reviewers, and the community criticized Nvidia for marketing it as an RTX 4080, given the equivalent performance of previous XX80-class cards when compared with other cards of the same series, and the large gap in specifications and performance compared to the 16GB variant. The criticism focused on Nvidia's naming scheme - two 4080 models were to be offered, an "RTX 4080 12GB" and an "RTX 4080 16GB" - the obvious interpretation was that the only difference between the two products would be a difference in VRAM capacity. However, unlike other examples of Nvidia GPUs with differing memory configurations within the same class which have typically been very close in processing performance, the RTX 4080 12GB uses a completely different processing unit and memory architecture: the 4080 12GB would use the AD104 die, which features 27% fewer CUDA cores than the 16GB variant's AD103 die. It would also have a reduced TDP (285W - the 16GB variant was configured to draw up to 320W), and a cut-down 192-bit memory bus. In prior generations (e.g., the GeForce GTX 10, RTX 20 and RTX 30 series), a 192-bit bus width had been reserved for XX60-class cards and below. These changes made the card up to 30% slower than the RTX 4080 16GB in memory-agnostic performance, while being priced significantly higher than previous XX70-class cards ($900 vs. $500 for the RTX 3070, approximately 80% more expensive).

On October 14, 2022, Nvidia announced that due to the confusion caused by the naming scheme, it would be "unlaunching"—i.e. postponing the launch of—the RTX 4080 12GB, with the RTX 4080 16GB's launch remaining unaffected.

On January 3, 2023, Nvidia reintroduced the RTX 4080 12GB as the RTX 4070 Ti during CES 2023 and reduced its list price by $100. The 4070 Ti's production was stopped with the introduction of the 4070 Ti Super.

=== 12VHPWR connector failures ===
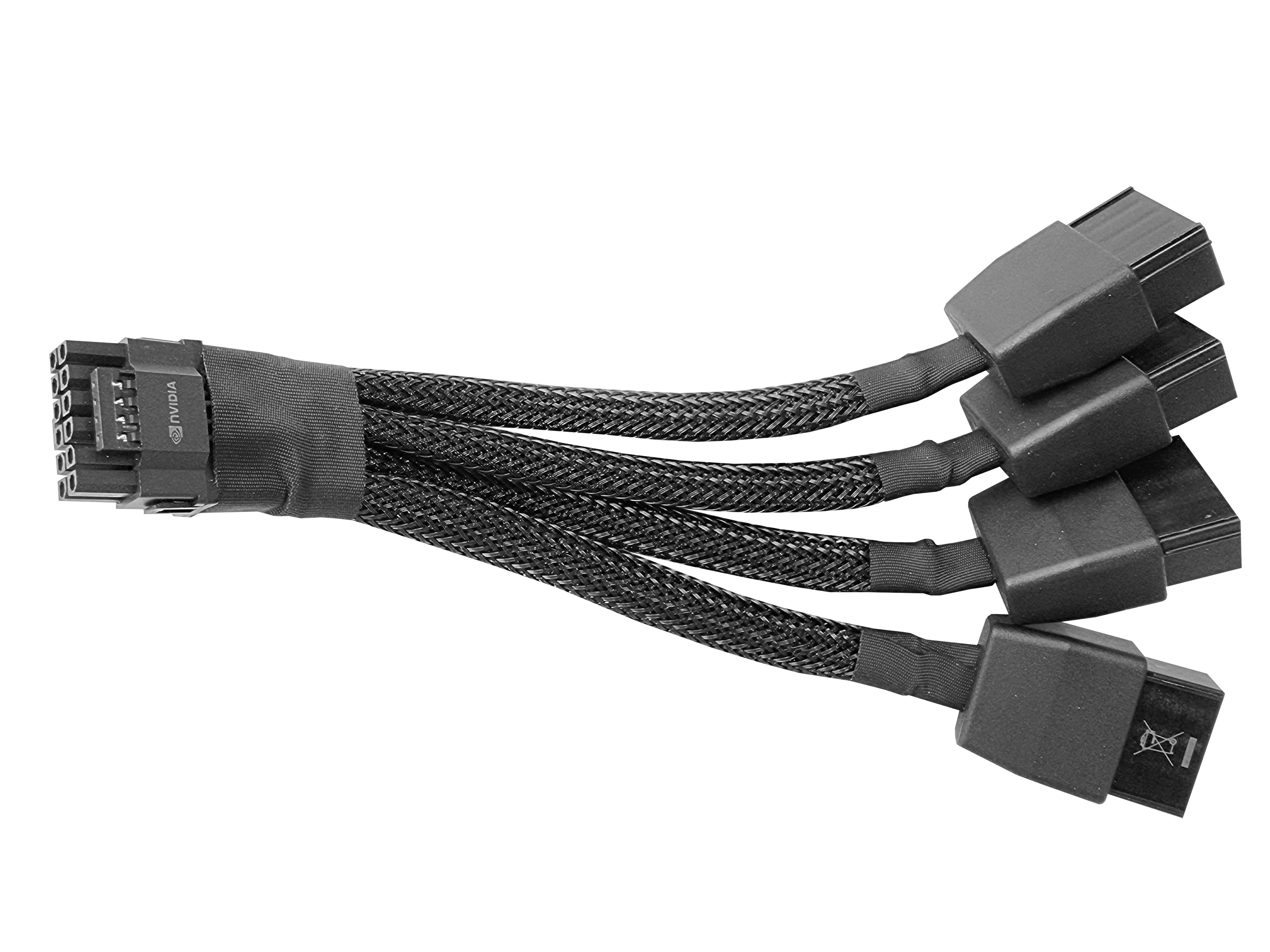
The Nvidia 12VHPWR adapter supplied with RTX 4090 cards

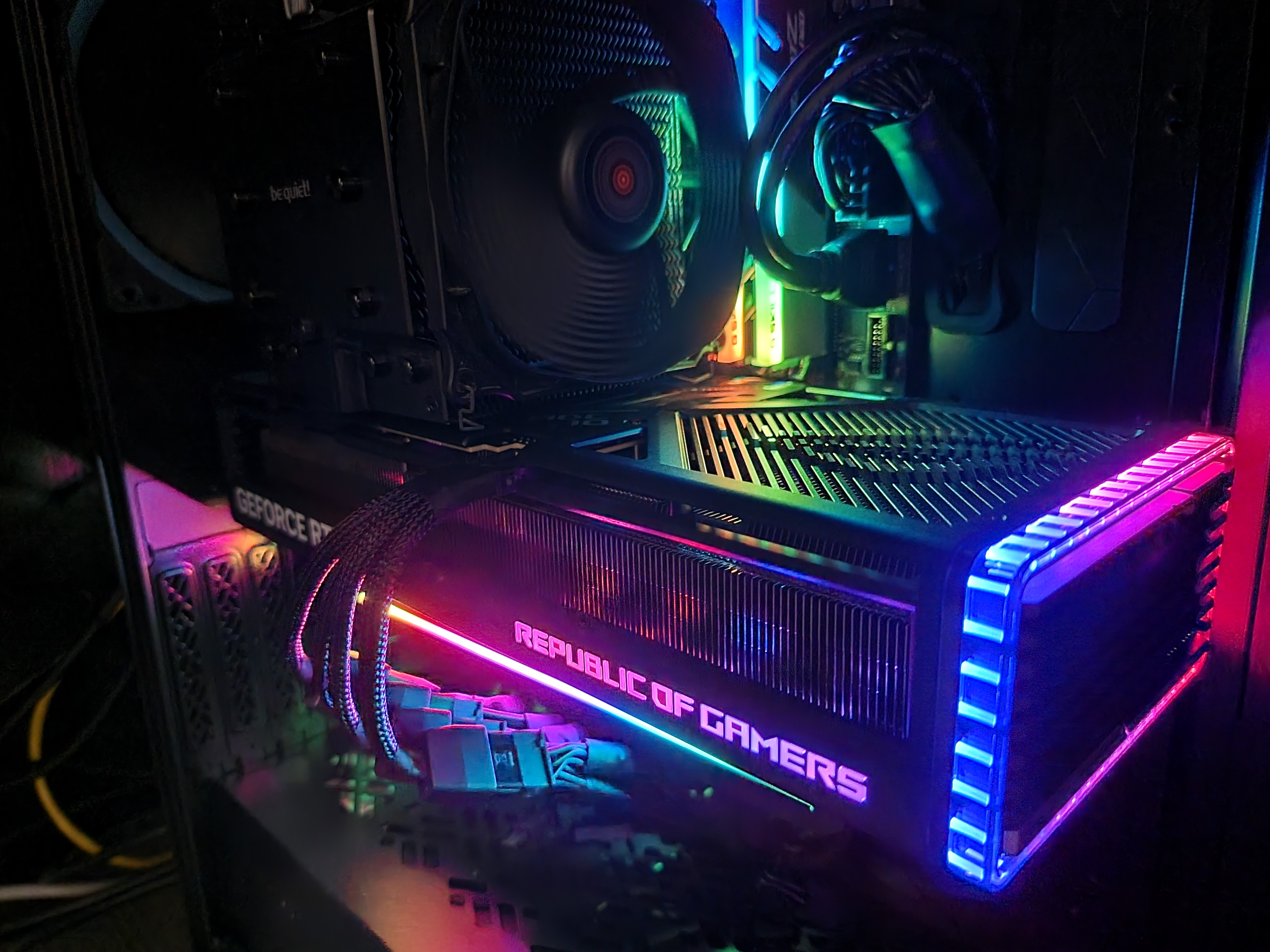
Asus Strix RTX 4090 using 12VHPWR connector with an adapter

Some buyers of the Nvidia RTX 4090, the first GPU to use the new connector, reported that the connectors of their RTX 4090 were melting, which sparked several theories to explain it. After investigation, several sources reported that the main cause was the 12VHPWR connector not being fully seated while being put under load that resulted in overheating of the connector's pins, which in turn caused the melting of the plastic housing.

PCI-SIG, the standards organization responsible for the creation of the 12VHPWR connector, has decided to make changes to the connector's specifications following the failures.

A class-action lawsuit has been filed against Nvidia over melting 12VHPWR cables which the lawsuit states is "a dangerous product that should not have been sold in its current state". The plaintiff who brought the suit claims that Nvidia unjustly enriched itself, violated the product's warranty and engaged in fraud and they are demanding that Nvidia pay damages to affected customers as compensation. However, this lawsuit was voluntarily dismissed with prejudice by the plaintiff on March 10, 2023. No reason is provided as to why the case was dismissed.

Following its own investigation and testing, Nvidia officially offered a statement on the melting connectors. They determined that the melting connectors are caused by user error from not inserting the 12VHPWR connector properly, causing partial contact. They have offered an expedited RMA process for any RTX 4090 affected by the melting connectors. PCI-SIG later said in a statement that Nvidia and their partners were still responsible for testing their products to account for user error.

A revised connector design intended to address these issues was introduced under the new name 12V-2x6.

In February 2024, the U.S. Consumer Product Safety Commission announced a voluntary recall of 12VHPWR adapters made by Cablemod. According to the recall filing, 272 reports were filed with about 25,300 units shipped. The recall covers adapters using both the initial and the revised 12V-2x6 (CEM 5.1) design.

It was also reported that the new connectors have a limited lifespan of around 30–40 mating cycles before contact potentially becoming unreliable.

It has been also noted that the older 6- and 8-pin connectors had substantially larger manufacturer-specified current-carrying capacity in relation to the power limits specified by PCI SIG:

Connector	8-pin power	12VHPWR (H+) / 12V-2x6 (H++)
Rated current per pin	4 – 7 A (Note: Depending on the wire cross-section. HCS-type terminals have lower contact resistances, permitting even higher currents and more mating cycles.)	9.5 A
Rated power (Note: For the entire connector with all applicable pins loaded at 12 V. The old 8-pin power connector only uses three pins each for ground and 12 V. For this calculation the nominal voltage is used instead of considering the ATX 2.0/3.0 tolerance band.)	7 A × 12 V × 3 pin = 252 W	9.5 A × 12 V × 6 pin = 684 W
Specified power (Note: Specified in the PCI-SIG CEM specification)	150 W	525 W / 600 W
Safety factor	1.68	1.30 / 1.14

=== RTX 4090 U.S. export restrictions ===
The United States Department of Commerce began enacting restrictions on the GeForce RTX 4090 for export to certain countries in 2023. This was targeted mainly towards China as an attempt to halt its AI development. However as a result of this, the market price of the RTX 4090 rose by 25% as China began to stockpile 4090s. This led to Nvidia releasing a China-specific model of the RTX 4090 called the RTX 4090D (D standing for "Dragon"). The RTX 4090D features a shaved down AD102 die with 14592 CUDA cores, down from 16384 cores of the original RTX 4090 SKU.

The restrictions began on November 17, 2023, effectively banning the RTX 4090 from China and other countries on the export restricted list.

== Gallery ==
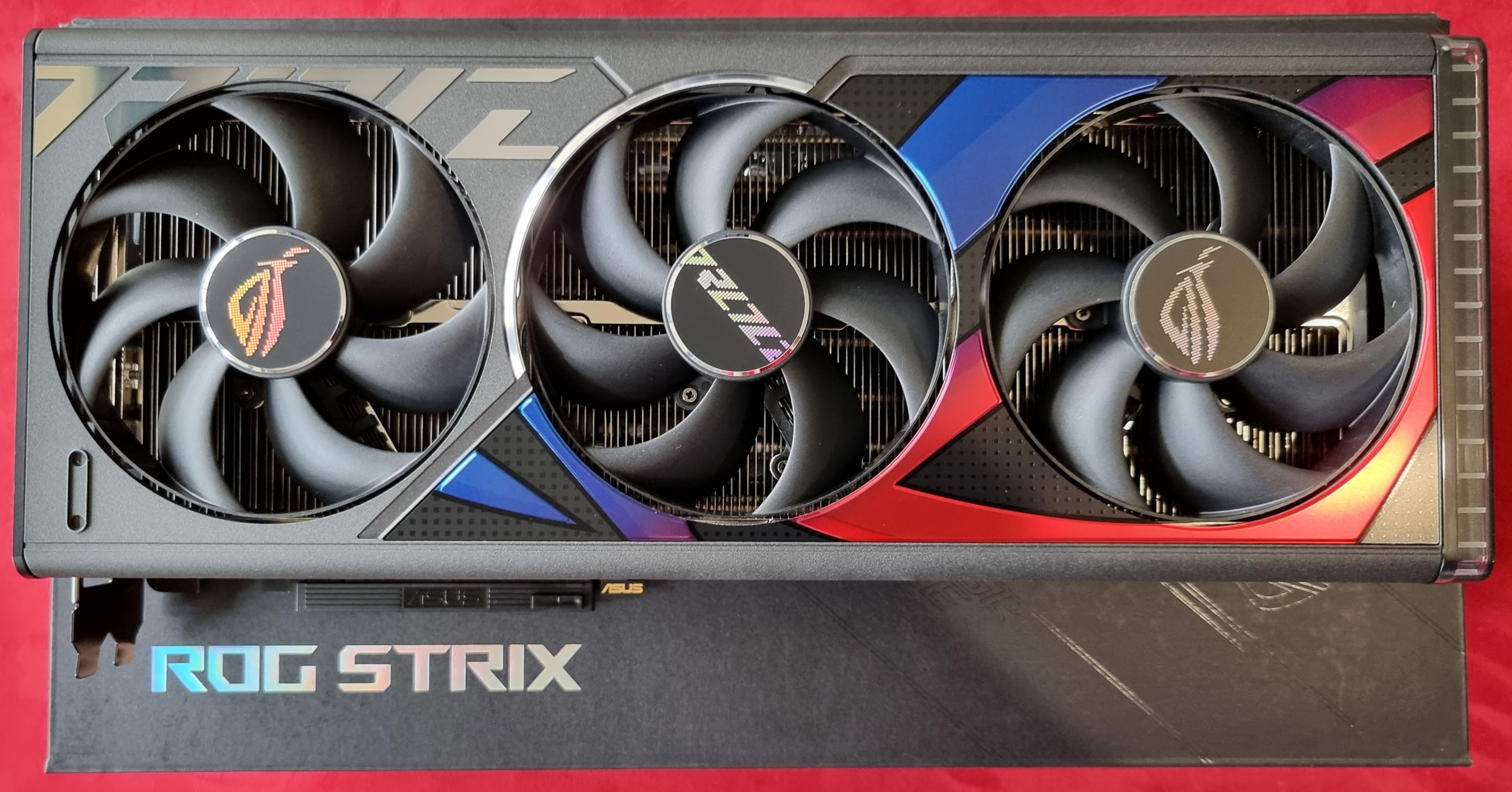
Nvidia GeForce RTX 4090 ROG STRIX Edition, manufactured by board-partner ASUS

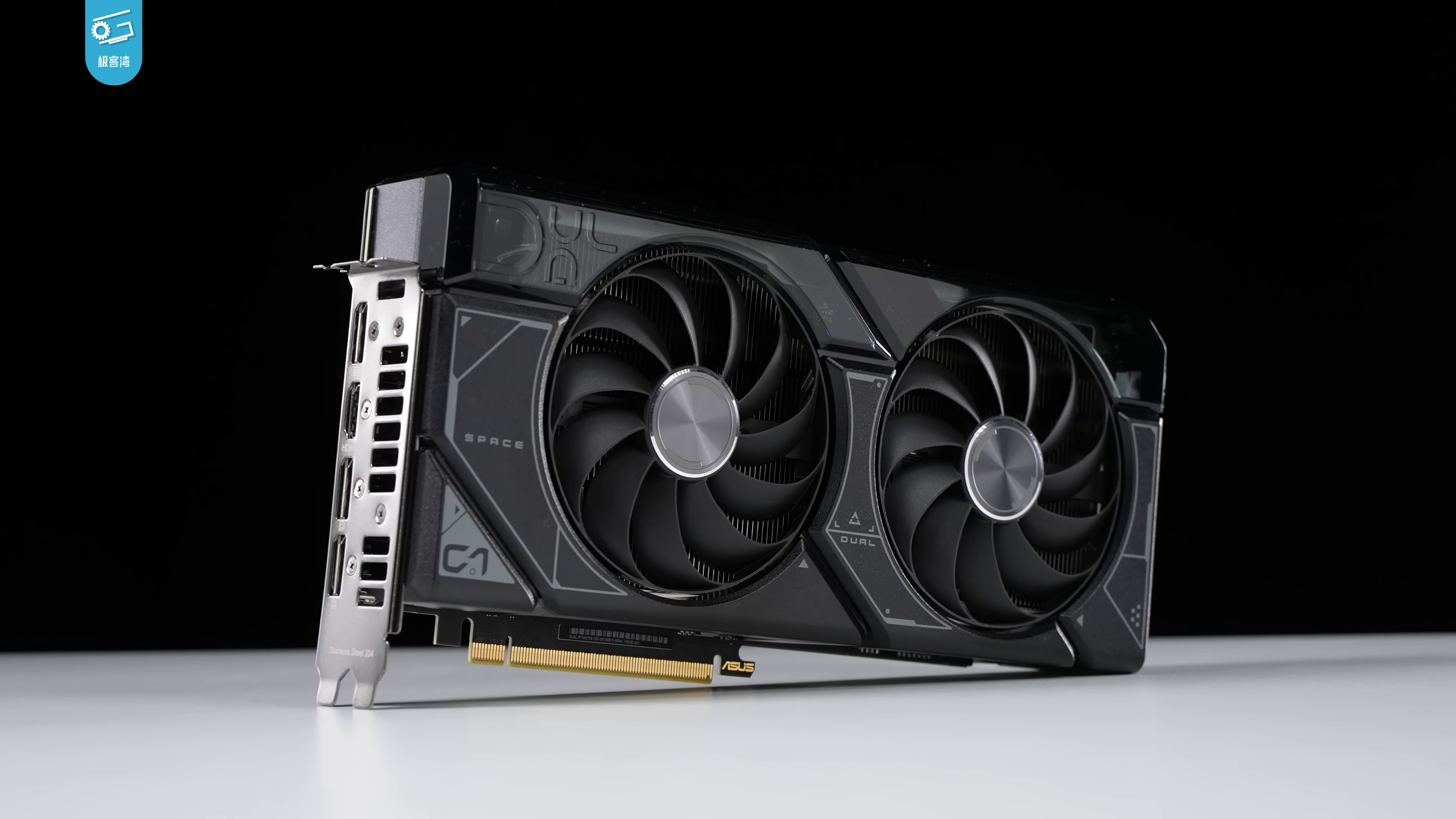
Nvidia GeForce RTX 4070S DUAL Edition, manufactured by board-partner ASUS

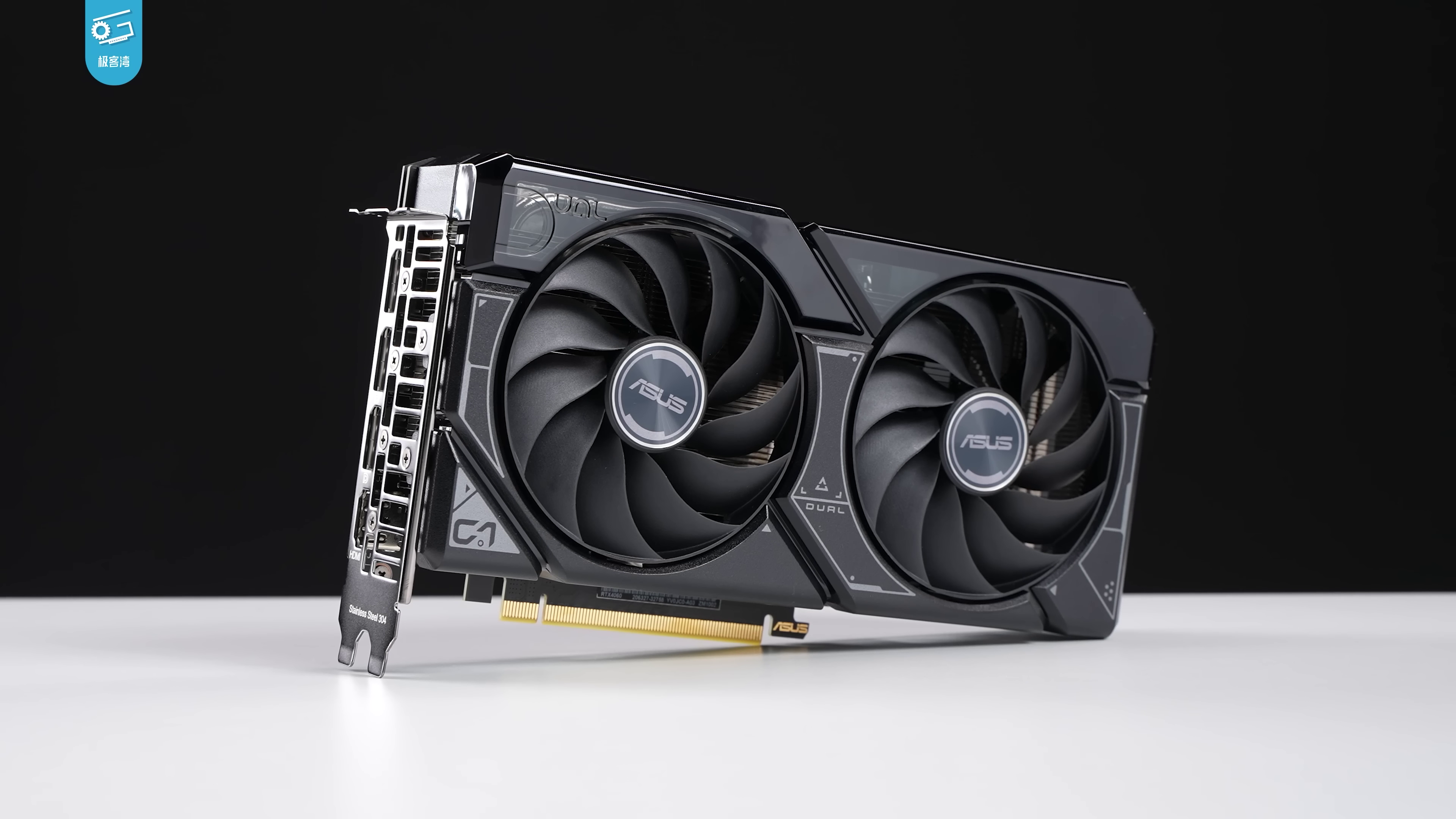
Nvidia GeForce RTX 4060 DUAL Edition, manufactured by board-partner ASUS

== See also ==
- GeForce GTX 10 series
- GeForce GTX 16 series
- GeForce RTX 20 series
- Ada Lovelace (microarchitecture)
- Nvidia Workstation GPUs (formerly Quadro)
- Nvidia Data Center GPUs (formerly Tesla)
- List of Nvidia graphics processing units
- Radeon RX 7000 series – competing AMD series released in a similar time-frame
