= Fast Five (consulting) =

Consulting firms

- Company type: Publicly traded
- Industry: consulting firms
- Founded: 1990s

The "Fast Five" were a group of publicly traded consulting firms that developed in the mid 1990s to capitalize on the rapid commercial development of the Internet. The term "Fast Five" was coined to draw a contrast with the established "Big Five" accounting firms with management consulting arms, and to make the point that the new breed of consulting firms was more nimble and could produce more rapid results.

== Business performance and rapid growth ==
The firms innovate both technology and methodology, developing new techniques better adapted for Web site design and construction, along with back-end internet infrastructure. For example, Viant created a service model to obtain maximum utilization of the three essential disciplines (creative, business strategists, and technical professionals/software developers).

Deliverables move forward based on team consensus, with input from all three disciplines. Prior to the service model, most professional services firms utilized a waterfall model of system development where results from one phase were thrown "over the wall" with limit input from the team that would handle the next phase.

== Distinctive cultures ==
Most of the firms felt a need to differentiate themselves in their approach to employees and their appearance to clients. Razorfish created uniquely styled business cards. VIANT had strong ideas about office space needing to be located around the energy of a downtown area of a city.

== Staff and knowledge management ==
Another area of innovation was in knowledge management. The firms created internal intranets, office spaces, and organizational incentives and structures designed to encourage information sharing, as opposed to knowledge hoarding.

=== Viant ===
Viant's office space was created with Dunbar's number in mind, so that an office that grew to over 100 consultants would 'spawn' a new office with a small nucleus of experienced consultants. The goal was to limit the size of any one office to no more than 125 to 130 consultants, keeping the total number in the office well below Dunbar's estimate of 150. The effect was that each consultant in the office could maintain stable social relationships with everyone else.

== Rapid business growth ==
The firms grew rapidly, often increasing their annual revenues and staff at over 100% per year.

== Decline during the Dot-com downturn ==
Despite the aggressive growth of their businesses, most of the firms stock prices and prospects collapsed by late 2000 or early 2001, due to the collapse of the Internet bubble as well as increased competition from the "Big Five" and other established technology consulting firms.

== Firms in the "fast five" ==
- VIANT (internet consultancy) (NASDAQ:VIAN) - absorbed into divine Inc.
- Scient (NASDAQ:SCNT)- absorbed into iXL
- Razorfish (NASDAQ:RAZF)
- USWeb then MarchFirst (NASDAQ:USWB) then (NASDAQ:MRCH)
