= Proxicom =

- Type: Private
- Industry: Automotive, Financial Services, Retail & Consumer Goods, Healthcare, Technology & Media, Government, Energy & Utilities, and Industrial Materials & Goods
- Founded: 1991
- Headquarters: New York, New York, United States
- Key people: Raul Fernandez, CEO; Paul Cooley, President; Blue Van Dyke, EVP, Sales and Marketing; Ann Gaglioti, EVP, Operations; Tim Warder, SVP, Corp. Strategy
- Products: Interactive Strategy & Optimization; Creative Design & User Experience; Marketing Services; Technology, Development & Systems Integration

Proxicom, Inc. was an interactive agency that developed custom-tailored interactive and web-enabled solutions. The company was founded in 1991 by American entrepreneur Raul Fernandez.

== History ==
In 1997, Proxicom launched its e-commerce website Polymerland. Created as an online platform to facilitate online sales and customer interactions and to digitalize plastic distribution.

Proxicom purchased Ibis Consulting, a technical integration firm located in San Francisco, California, in September 1998, and in May 1999 acquired Adhoc group, a user experience and creative design boutique based in Sausalito, California.

In 1998, Proxicom acquired first customers in Europe, starting with projects at BMW Financial Services in Munich, Germany, where the first office was opened outside of the U.S.

On April 14, 1999, Proxicom became a publicly traded organization listed on the NASDAQ stock exchange under the trading symbol PXCM. This IPO netted Proxicom investors $58.5 million and Proxicom became known as one of the "little five" — competing against MarchFirst/CKS-Web, Sapient, Scient, and Viant — within the interactive consulting arena.

In June 1999, Michael D. Beck was promoted to Executive Vice President, Client Services for the Americas and Proxicom grew to more than $200 million in revenues in 2000 with approximately 1,700 workers. Beck would later join The IQ Business Group, Inc. (IQBG) as president and CEO. In January and February of that year, Michael Hansen and Heiner Rutt joined the company as vice president for international operations and president respectively. Rutt left to join the Carlyle Group, the global private equity firm in 2002, and Hansen moved to Bertelsmann in 2001.

The Dot Com Bubble

In April 2001, Proxicom was purchased by Dimension Data, a South African-based networking services company. Dimension Data focused on the design, development, and construction of networking systems for global organizations.

== The Rebirth ==
In 2004, The Gores Group LLC, a privately held investment firm based in Los Angeles, purchased Proxicom from Dimension Data. In 2005, Proxicom expanded its industry offerings through the purchase of a healthcare services firm, Daou Systems, Inc.

In 2007, Proxicom was purchased by iCrossing.
