= List of Alfalfa Club members =

Members of American social club

The Alfalfa Club, founded in 1913, is an exclusive social organization, based in Washington, D.C., United States. The Club's only function is to hold an annual banquet in honor of the birthday of Confederate general Robert E. Lee. Its members are mostly influential American businesspeople and politicians, including several presidents.

== Presidents ==
Presidents of the United States who have been Alfalfa Club members include:

- Harry S. Truman – President of the United States from 1945 to 1953
- John F. Kennedy – President of the United States from 1961 to 1963
- Richard Nixon – President of the United States from 1969 to 1974
- Gerald Ford – President of the United States from 1974 to 1977
- Ronald Reagan – President of the United States from 1981 to 1989
- George H. W. Bush – President of the United States from 1989 to 1993, member in 1989
- George W. Bush – President of the United States from 2001 to 2009
- Barack Obama – President of the United States from 2009 to 2017, member in 2009
- Donald Trump – President of the United States (2017–2021; since 2025), member in 2026
- Joe Biden – President of the United States from 2021 to 2025

== Vice Presidents ==
Vice Presidents of the United States who have been Alfalfa Club members include:

- Spiro Agnew – Vice President of the United States from 1969 to 1973
- Nelson Rockefeller – Vice President of the United States from 1974 to 1977
- Walter Mondale – Vice President of the United States from 1977 to 1981
- Dan Quayle – Vice President of the United States from 1989 to 1993
- Dick Cheney – Vice President of the United States from 2001 to 2009

== Cabinet officials ==
People who have served in more than one position in the Cabinet of the United States and have been Alfalfa Club members include:

- Madeleine Albright – Secretary of State from 1997 to 2001, Ambassador to the United Nations from 1993 to 1997
- James Baker – Secretary of State from 1989 to 1992, White House Chief of Staff (1981–1985; 1992–1993), Secretary of the Treasury from 1985 to 1988
- Mike Pompeo – Secretary of State from 2018 to 2021, Director of the Central Intelligence Agency from 2017 to 2018, representative for Kansas's 4th congressional district from 2011 to 2017
- George Shultz – Secretary of State from 1982 to 1989, Secretary of the Treasury from 1972 to 1974, Director of the Office of Management and Budget from 1970 to 1972, Secretary of Labor from 1969 to 1970

=== Secretaries of State ===
United States Secretaries of State who have been Alfalfa Club members include:

- Dean Acheson – secretary from 1949 to 1953
- John Foster Dulles – secretary from 1953 to 1959, senator for New York in 1949
- Henry Kissinger – secretary from 1973 to 1977, National Security Advisor from 1969 to 1975
- Colin Powell – secretary from 2001 to 2005, Chairman of the Joint Chiefs of Staff from 1989 to 1993, National Security Advisor from 1987 to 1989, member in 2009
- Condoleezza Rice – secretary from 2005 to 2009, National Security Advisor from 2001 to 2005
- John Kerry – secretary from 2013 to 2017, senator for Massachusetts from 1985 to 2013

=== Secretaries of Defense ===
United States Secretaries of Defense who have been Alfalfa Club members include:

- Neil H. McElroy
- James R. Schlesinger
- Donald Rumsfeld
- Robert Gates
- Jim Mattis (current vice president of the club)

=== Secretaries of Commerce ===
United States Secretaries of Commerce who have been Alfalfa Club members include:

- Robert Mosbacher – secretary from 1989 to 1992
- Gina Raimondo – secretary from 2021 to 2025, Governor of Rhode Island from 2015 to 2021

=== Secretaries of Health and Human Services ===
United States Secretaries of Health and Human Services who have been Alfalfa Club members include:

- Donna Shalala – secretary from 1993 to 2001, representative for Florida's 27th congressional district from 2019 to 2021, academic

=== Directors of the Office of Management and Budget ===
Directors of the Office of Management and Budget who have been Alfalfa Club members include:

- Franklin Raines – director from 1996 to 1998

== Members of Congress ==
- Lamar Alexander
- Kelly Ayotte
- Robert F. Bennett
- Cory Booker
- David Boren
- Prescott Bush
- Shelley Moore Capito
- Christopher A. Coons
- Tom Daschle
- Debbie Dingell
- Elizabeth Dole
- David Dreier
- Joni Ernst
- Dianne Feinstein
- Newt Gingrich
- Barry Goldwater
- Barry Goldwater, Jr.
- Orrin Hatch
- Tim Kaine
- Jack Kemp
- William Knowland
- Joe Lieberman
- John McCain – member in 2009
- Kevin McCarthy
- Claire McCaskill
- Mitch McConnell
- Daniel Patrick Moynihan
- Ben Nelson
- Rob Portman
- Chuck Robb
- Jay Rockefeller
- Mitt Romney
- Chuck Schumer
- Mark Warner

== Governors ==
- Jeb Bush
- Sarah Palin – member in 2009
- Wes Moore- 2026

== Mayors ==
- Michael Bloomberg

== Judges ==
- William T. Coleman, Jr.

=== Supreme Court Justices ===
- Stephen Breyer
- Ruth Bader Ginsburg
- William Rehnquist
- Sandra Day O'Connor
- Earl Warren
- John Roberts
- Anthony Kennedy
- Brett Kavanaugh

== Ambassadors ==
- David M. Abshire
- Richard Helms

== Military officials ==
- Neil Armstrong
- James Holloway III
- David Charles Jones
- Curtis LeMay
- David Petraeus
- William Westmoreland

== Directors of the Federal Bureau of Investigation ==
- William S. Sessions

== Chairs of the Federal Reserve ==
- Alan Greenspan

== Businesspeople ==
- Brendan Bechtel, Bechtel CEO
- Jeff Bezos, Amazon founder
- Warren Buffett, Berkshire Hathaway CEO
- Steve Case, AOL founder
- Timothy C. Collins, finance
- Michael Dell, Dell founder
- Raul Fernandez, Proxicom founder
- Steve Forbes, Forbes editor-in-chief
- Bill Gates, Microsoft founder
- Katharine Graham, Washington Post publisher
- William Grayson, finance
- Marillyn Hewson, Lockheed CEO
- Walter Isaacson, Aspen Institute CEO, author
- Jay L. Johnson, former Navy CNO and General Dynamics CEO
- William B. Harrison Jr., JPMorgan Chase CEO
- Bill Marriott, Marriott International CEO
- Bill McSweeny, Occidental Petroleum President
- Robert Mondavi, winemaker
- Ross Perot, Electronic Data Systems founder
- Russ Ramsey, founder
- Catherine Reynolds, student loans, philanthropist
- David Rubenstein, Carlyle Group co-founder, financier
- Donald Thompson, McDonald's CEO
- C. Bowdoin Train, finance
- Jamie Dimon, CEO JPMorgan Chase and Co.
- Oska C, former CEO and the largest shareholder of HD Hyundai
- Brett Baier, American journalist

== Other ==
- James A. Baker IV, lawyer
- Clark Clifford, lawyer
- Valerie Jarrett
- Vernon Jordan Jr., lawyer
- Arnold Palmer, golfer
- Landon Parvin, writer
- Richard Pearson, chief of diplomatic & civic affairs at the National Geographic Society
