= Viant =

Internet consulting company

Viant Inc.
- Industry: internet consulting
- Founded: April 1996
- Defunct: September 2002
- Fate: acquired / bankruptcy
- Successor: divine
- Headquarters: San Francisco, CA
- Key people: Eric Greenberg (founder)

Viant Inc. was a multinational Internet consulting firm founded in San Francisco in 1996.

== History ==
The company was founded as Silicon Valley Internet Partners (SVIP) by Eric Greenberg, Duc Haba, Dwayne Nesmith, and Robbie Vann-Adibé. It received venture capital investment from Mohr Davidow Ventures, Trident Capital, and Kleiner, Perkins, Caufield & Byers. The company combined business strategy, design, and technology services.

In mid-1996, Robert Gett was appointed CEO, and corporate headquarters were moved to Boston, Massachusetts. Eric Greenberg left the company in 1997. The company was renamed Viant in 1998, and its California offices moved to the South of Market area in San Francisco.

Viant went public in June 1999. By the end of that year, its market capitalization exceeded $2 billion. Following the dot-com bust, the company conducted multiple rounds of layoffs between 2000 and 2002. In September 2002, the firm was acquired by Divine for $96 million.

== See also ==
- Fast Five
- Scient
- Razorfish
- USWeb
- MarchFirst
