= Advanced Battlestations =

Gaming systems integrator

ABS Computer Technologies, Inc.
- Trade name: Advanced Battlestations
- Type: Subsidiary
- Industry: Consumer electronics
- Incorporated: California
- Founded: 1990
- Founder: Fred Chang
- Headquarters: Diamond Bar, California, United States
- Area served: Worldwide
- Key people: Steven Chien
- Parent: Newegg Commerce
- Website: abs.com

Advanced Battlestations (ABS) is a gaming systems integrator. They assemble in-house using name brand retail components from entry level builds to high end machines.

== History ==
ABS Computer Technologies was founded in 1990 by Fred Chang under the name "Always Better Service," operating as a systems integrator and direct-mail computer provider out of Southern California. Over the years, it build a reputation in custom-built and gaming PCs, working with major component makers like Intel, AMD, NVIDIA, and Microsoft, and eventually became a subsidiary of the e-commerce retailer Newegg.

On October 1, 2020, Newegg relaunched the ABS brand, now standing for "Advanced Battlestations," to focus squarely on the gaming community.

== Reception ==
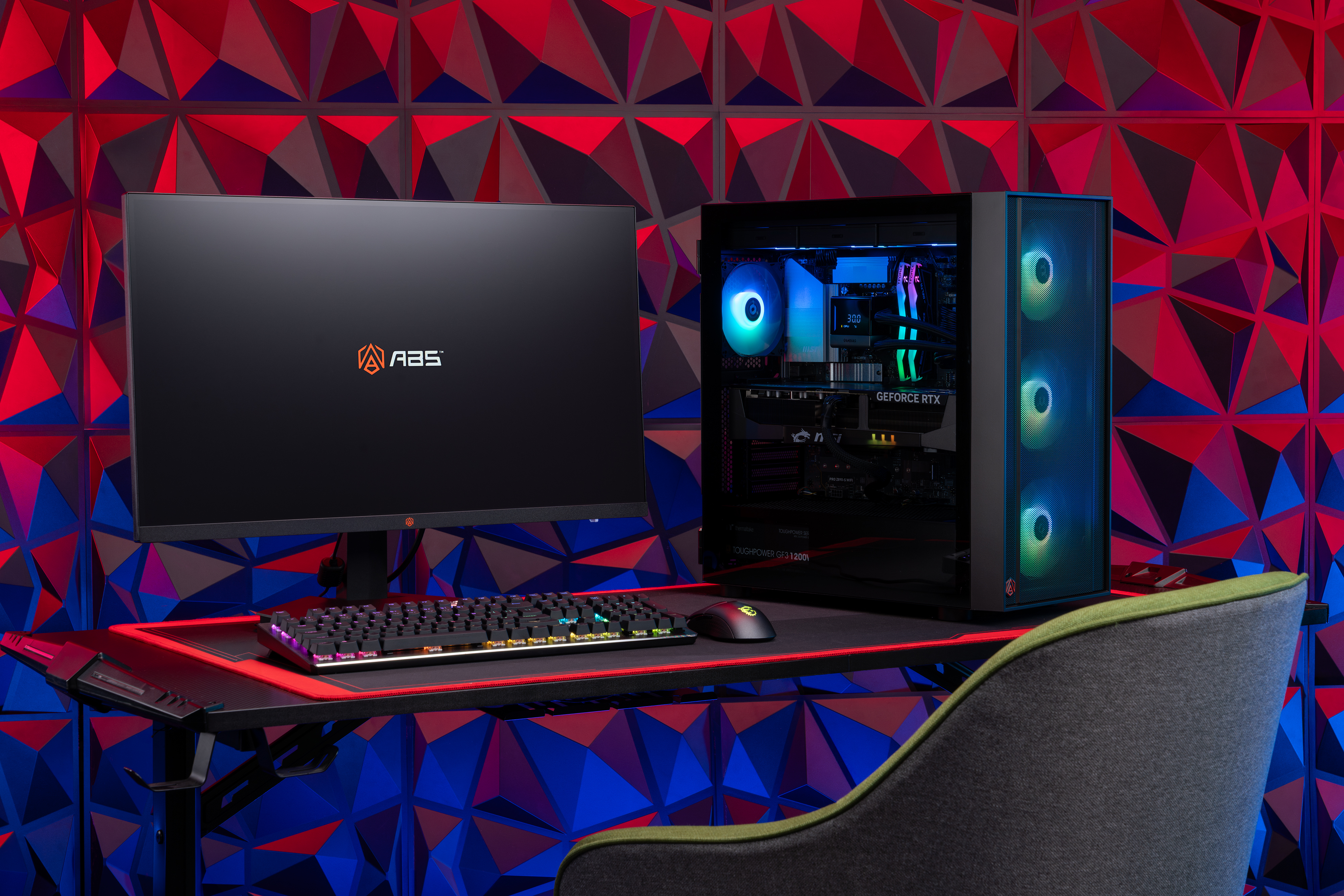
Custom ABS PC and monitor setup

ABS Gaming PCs have generally been well received by tech and gaming reviewers. Gamers Nexus, in its prebuilt PC review series, called the ABS Challenger one of the most impressive prebuild computers it had tested, one of only a few to do well in its benchmarks.

In 2022, Windows Central described another ABS Challenger model as one of the best affordable prebuilt gaming PCs it had used, giving it credit for using real, name-brand parts instead of the cheaper components many prebuilt brands rely on.

PC Gamer reviewed several ABS models over the years and generally found them to be good value for the money.

Other outlets, including Digital Trends, CNET, TechRadar, Tom's Hardware, and Creative Bloq, have also recommended ABS systems in their buying guides and deal roundups.
