= CKS Group =

- Type: Public
- Industry: Advertising
- Founded: 1991
- Founder: Bill Cleary; Mark Kvamme; Tom Suiter
- Fate: Merged with USWeb, 1998
- Headquarters: Cupertino, California

CKS Group was an advertising agency based in Cupertino, California, that catered to technology companies. The initials CKS came from the three name partners, Bill Cleary, Mark Kvamme, and Tom Suiter. All three had previously worked for Apple Computer. The company went public in 1995 and merged with USWeb in 1998.

== History ==
The origins of CKS Group went back to Cleary Communications, a business venture started by Cleary in 1987. Kvamme bought into the venture in 1989, and the CKS name was adopted in 1991 after Suiter joined the other two.

Due to its partners' history, the company had a natural expertise with interface design and other technical matters that distinguished it from traditional advertising agencies. It also had a ready-made client base, with Apple as one of its major customers. CKS bought a video production studio from Apple and at one point contemplated putting together a cable television channel with Ziff-Davis Publishing. The studio was to be used to create infomercials to fill airtime, while also doing work for Apple, which had a demand for video work but had found the studio too expensive to maintain.

In late 1998, CKS Group merged with USWeb. The merger was a stock transaction involving an exchange of 1.5 shares of USWeb stock for each share of CKS. At the time, USWeb was still losing money while CKS had managed to post a profit in its latest quarter. With an estimated value of the transaction approaching $350 million when the deal was announced, the combined market capitalization of the two companies was around $728 million. The news prompted a fall in USWeb's stock price while CKS stock, which had been trading near 52-week lows, rose initially but then fell again.

Among the benefits touted was joining USWeb's technical and Internet design skills with the traditional advertising and marketing savvy of CKS. The merged company was to be renamed Reinvent Communications, but the new name did not stick and the company was generally known as USWeb/CKS or simply USWeb. With the merger, the company had nearly 2,000 employees and clients, including Apple Computer, Levi Strauss, and Harley-Davidson. Since both companies had been busy making acquisitions, the deal prompted concerns about integrating these into a single organization along with a potential culture clash. There was also a wide age gap between the younger USWeb employees and those of CKS.

In December 1999, after buying boutique management consulting firm Mitchell Madison Group for over $300 million, USWeb merged with Whittman-Hart, another consulting firm based in Chicago. The combined company, a merger of equals, had over 10,000 employees with annual revenues exceeding $1 billion. This deal involved Whittman-Hart exchanging 0.865 shares of its stock for each share of USWeb, and another new name for the merged company as marchFIRST Inc. The new company was headed by Whittman-Hart CEO Robert Bernard. Shaw was announced as chairman but resigned prior to taking on that role.

With the burst of the dot-com bubble, marchFIRST went into bankruptcy in April 2001 and its assets were liquidated. Some of the units, including USWeb and Whittman-Hart, survived the breakup and re-emerged as separate companies.
