= Fast Five (disambiguation) =

Fast Five is a 2011 action film. The term may also refer to:

- Fast Five (soundtrack), the soundtrack to the film
- Fast Five (score), the score to the film composed by Brian Tyler
- Dan Auerbach and the Fast Five, a blues-rock group
- Fast Five (consulting), a group of internet consultancies specialized in developing web sites
- Fast5, a shortened version of netball
