= National UFO Conference =

Ufology conference

The National UFO Conference (NUFOC) was an annual conference held in Hollywood, California. The conference was based in San Diego, California. Its stated mission was "to present top researchers in the field of ufology who will share their ongoing and current research." The National UFO Conference was the longest active conference in the United States presenting information on the UFO phenomenon.

== History ==
The conference was started in 1964 and originally went by the name Congress of Scientific Ufologists. It was first hosted in Cleveland, Ohio. The meeting's name was later changed to National UFO Conference as the original name was considered pretentious.

In 2004, James W. Moseley retired as the NUFOC's Permanent Chairman and Lisa Davis became the Executive Director.

In 2004, Davis decided to keep NUFOC in Hollywood. She believed that expanding contacts within the entertainment community will greatly assist in raising public awareness of the phenomena. "I took over directing the National UFO Conference not for monetary gain, but rather to advance awareness of the phenomena." Davis has had a fascination with astronomy since childhood. Her research has covered many different aspects of philosophy, religion, science, medicine, and the paranormal. One of Davis's goals is to bring the UFO/Abduction scenario into the mainstream public awareness in a professional and practical manner.

Davis has been very active in ufology since 1997. She started The Foundation For Abductee Research and Support in 2000 where she created an online presence of support and information for those unwillingly involved in the abduction phenomenon. In 2003 Davis attended The National UFO Conference in Los Angeles and quickly became active in assisting Moseley in the planning of the 2004 conference. In 2004 Davis accepted Moseley's offer to become the new permanent chairman of NUFOC. Davis produced NUFOC 2004 and 2005 until her untimely departure from Ufology.

Davis was interviewed by FATE magazine on "Looking Ahead: UFO Trends for 2006" in Fate Magazine's 2005 UFO Special where she was listed as one of the top 100 UFO researchers in Ufology today. Davis was also interviewed by UFO Magazine for the November 2005 issue. Davis has also appeared on the History Channel show UFO Files "UFO Hunters" and in "Fastwalkers" Mankind's most carefully guarded secret revealed! A feature film documentary.

== Conferences ==
- NUFOC 42: Hollywood, CA - September 2–4, 2005
- NUFOC 41: Hollywood, CA - October 29–31, 2004
- NUFOC 40: Hollywood, CA - 2003
- NUFOC 39: Kings Island Resort and Conference Center (Cincinnati, OH) - September 28, 2002. Organized by Kenny Young.
  - Speaker list: Rick Hilberg "Ufology: The First 30 Years", Don Weatherby and Wendy Ban of OHMUFON "MUFON's WUFOD", Jerry Black "Credibility In Ufology", John Timmerman of CUFOS "The Media and UFO's", Derrel Sims "Alien Abductions", Stephen Bassett "The Politics of Disclosure".
- NUFOC 38: Originally scheduled for Austin, Texas - September 14–16, 2001. Canceled and merged with Pat Marcatillio's "Annual UFO/ET/Alien and Abduction Congress" in New Jersey, October 6–7, 2001.
- NUFOC 36: Seven Oaks Hotel and Conference Center (San Antonio, TX) - September 25–26, 1999.
  - Speaker list: Walt Andrus "The Disappearance of Frederick Valentich in Australia", Joe Firmage "The Truth & ISSO", Jim Moseley "Weird Personal Experiences of a Skeptical Believer", Patrick Huyghe "The Alien Horde: A field Guide Approach to the Unknown", Kevin Randle "The Abduction Enigma: A Scientific Analysis", Karl Pflock "Behind the Flying Saucers: A New Twist on Aztec", Constance Clear "Abductees: Human Ambassadors or Lab Rats?", Whitley Strieber "Why Do We Deny It?", Tom Deuley "MJ-12 & El Indio-Guerrero Crash", Linda Corley "An Intimate Conversation with Major Jesse A. Marcel, Sr."
