= Andrew Filipowski =

American businessman

Andrew J. "Flip" Filipowski
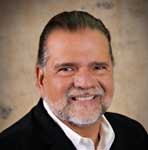
- Born: 1950 (age 74–75); Chicago, Illinois
- Occupation: Technology Entrepreneur

Andrew J. "Flip" Filipowski is a Polish American technology entrepreneur born in 1950 in Chicago. He is currently the executive chairman and CEO of SilkRoad Equity, a private investment firm, and founded Platinum technology in 1987. He is also currently the Co-CEO of 'Fluree PBC', a blockchain database technology company. He also founded and is the chairman of VeriBlock a technology company that provides Bitcoin security to the world's blockchains. He founded or co-founded Blue Rhino Corporation, Primo Water, SilkRoad technology Inc., Divine Inc., DBMS Inc., the House of Blues, SolidSpace Inc., Onramp Branding, MissionMode, Unocoin and InterAct 911. Platinum technology was sold to Computer Associates in 1999 for $3.5 billion, a record at the time for a software company. Filipowski's personal proceeds from the deal were $290 million.

Filipowski founded or served in an executive capacity in a number of companies including divine, inc., DBMS, Inc. and Cullinet Corp; he also served in various managerial and technical positions with A.B. Dick, Motorola and Time, Inc. Throughout the course of his career, Filipowski, along with his management team, has acquired and integrated nearly 200 public and private companies.

Filipowski was the 1998 recipient of the Anti-Defamation League's Torch of Liberty Award, first for the Silicon Prairie (Chicago), for his support in fighting hate on the Internet.

In 2000, he was named one of the 100 most influential individuals in the technology field in Upside magazine's 2000 Upside Elite 100 list.
