= Michael E. Hansen =

German lawyer

- Born: Michael Ekkehard Hansen; Wuppertal, Germany
- Education: University of Bonn (LLM); Columbia University (MBA)
- Occupation: CEO of Cengage

Michael Ekkehard Hansen is a German lawyer who is the chief executive officer of Cengage Learning. Hansen specialises in the evolution of the educational publishing industry, especially the transition the industry is making from print to digital and the development of new digital product lines.

== Career ==
Hansen was born and grew up in Wuppertal, Germany. He received a Master of Laws from the University of Bonn, Germany. He then obtained an MBA in from Columbia University. Hansen joined the Boston Consulting Group in New York in 1989, staying for 11 years. He rose to become a partner and co-chairman of the company's e-business and media practice. After serving briefly as head of international operations at Proxicom, an internet focused technology company, he moved to Bertelsmann, a German media corporation, as executive Vice President of Operational Excellence.

On August 14, 2006, he became the President and Chief Executive Officer of Harcourt Assessment, the educational materials arm of Reed Elsevier. From June 2008 to August 10, 2012, he served as the CEO of Health Sciences at Elsevier B.V., a division of Reed Elsevier. He served as President of Book Fairs and International at the Scholastic Corporation, and became its Executive Vice President since March 2008.

Since September 17, 2012, Hansen has been the CEO of Delmar-Cengage Learning and Cengage Learning Holdings II, Inc. He has worked on the financial restructuring of the company, which involved filing for Chapter 11 bankruptcy, eliminating approximately $4 billion in funded debt and securing $1.75 billion in exit financing.

== Personal life ==
Hansen was married in 1997 but his wife Carina van Knoop died in 2020 from cancer. Hansen and van Knopp had three sons: Charles, Leonard, and Cooper. He enjoys snow skiing and Bikram yoga.
