= Rosewill =

American technology company

Rosewill, Inc.
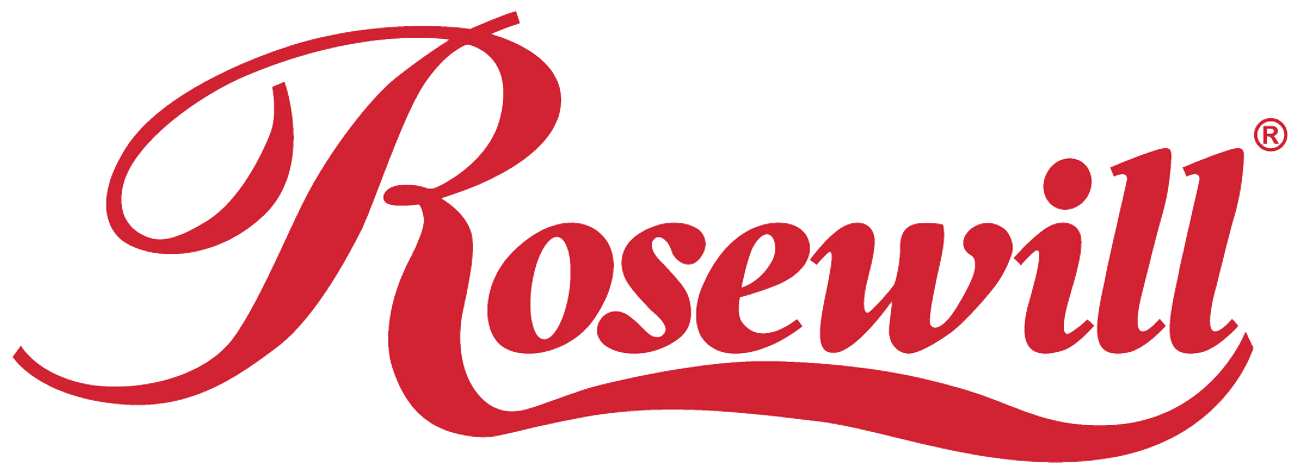
- Trade name: Rosewill
- Type: Subsidiary
- Industry: Consumer electronics
- Incorporated: California
- Founded: 2004
- Headquarters: Diamond Bar, California, United States
- Area served: Worldwide
- Parent: Newegg Commerce
- Website: rosewill.com

Rosewill, Inc. is an American technology brand operating as a private-label subsidiary of Newegg Inc. The company sells PC components, gaming peripherals, networking hardware and home appliances. Rosewill products are sold primarily through Newegg's retail storefronts, including Newegg.com and Newegg.ca.

== History ==
=== Early years and growth ===
Rosewill was established in 2004 as a private-label brand for Newegg Inc., the California-based online electronics retailer. Its initial product catalog consisted largely of commodity computer components: cables, keyboards, mice and computer cases.

Over the following decade, Rosewill expanded into power supply units and CPU coolers. The brand entered the gaming peripheral space in the early 2010s, introducing mechanical keyboards, gaming mice and headsets. By the mid-2010s, Rosewill had extended its product line into networking equipment and home appliances, including air purifiers, rice cookers and kitchen electronics, broadening its identity beyond pure PC hardware.

== Products ==
=== PC Products ===
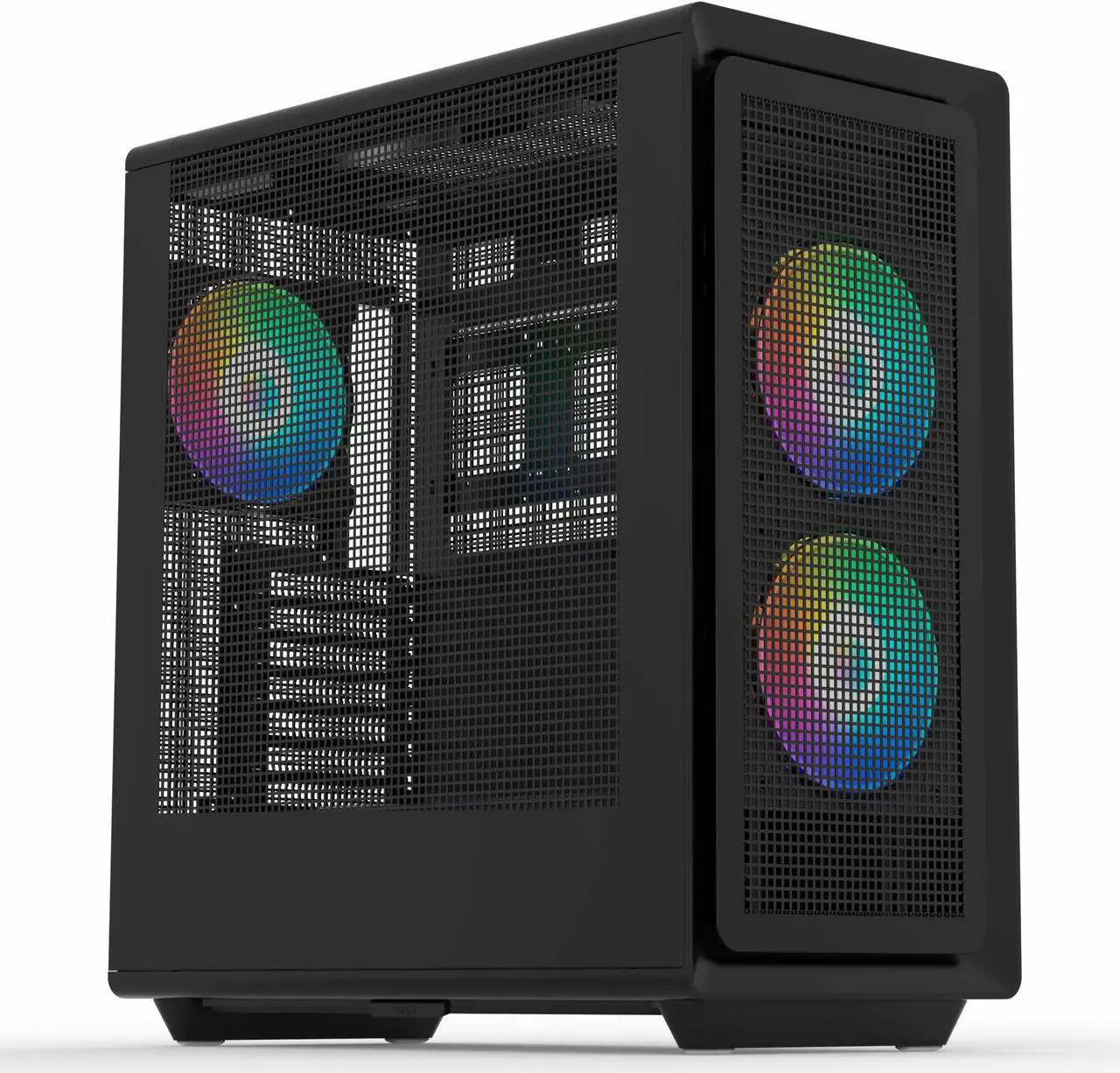
Rosewill Helium E-ATX

Rosewill's product catalog spans PC components and peripherals, including computer cases, power supply units, CPU cooling solutions, case fans, mechanical keyboards, gaming mice and headsets. Computer cases in the lineup range from standard mid-tower ATX enclosures to models featuring tempered glass panels and RGB lighting. Mechanical keyboards have been produced in various form factors using Cherry MX switches.

=== Networking ===
Rosewill's networking products include routers, switch, and network interface cards. The company also produces external hard drive enclosures, KVM switch, and USB hubs. Their lineup was designed to cover all general networking needs, from wireless adapters supporting 802.11n and 802.11ac standards to switches and powerline adapters for extending networks through home wall outlets.

=== Home Appliances ===
In a departure from its PC hardware roots, Rosewill also produces a line of home appliances, including hot pots, air fryers, electric kettles, rice cookers, slow cooker, air purifiers and humidifiers. These products are sold primarily through Newegg's retail storefronts.

=== NAS chassis ===
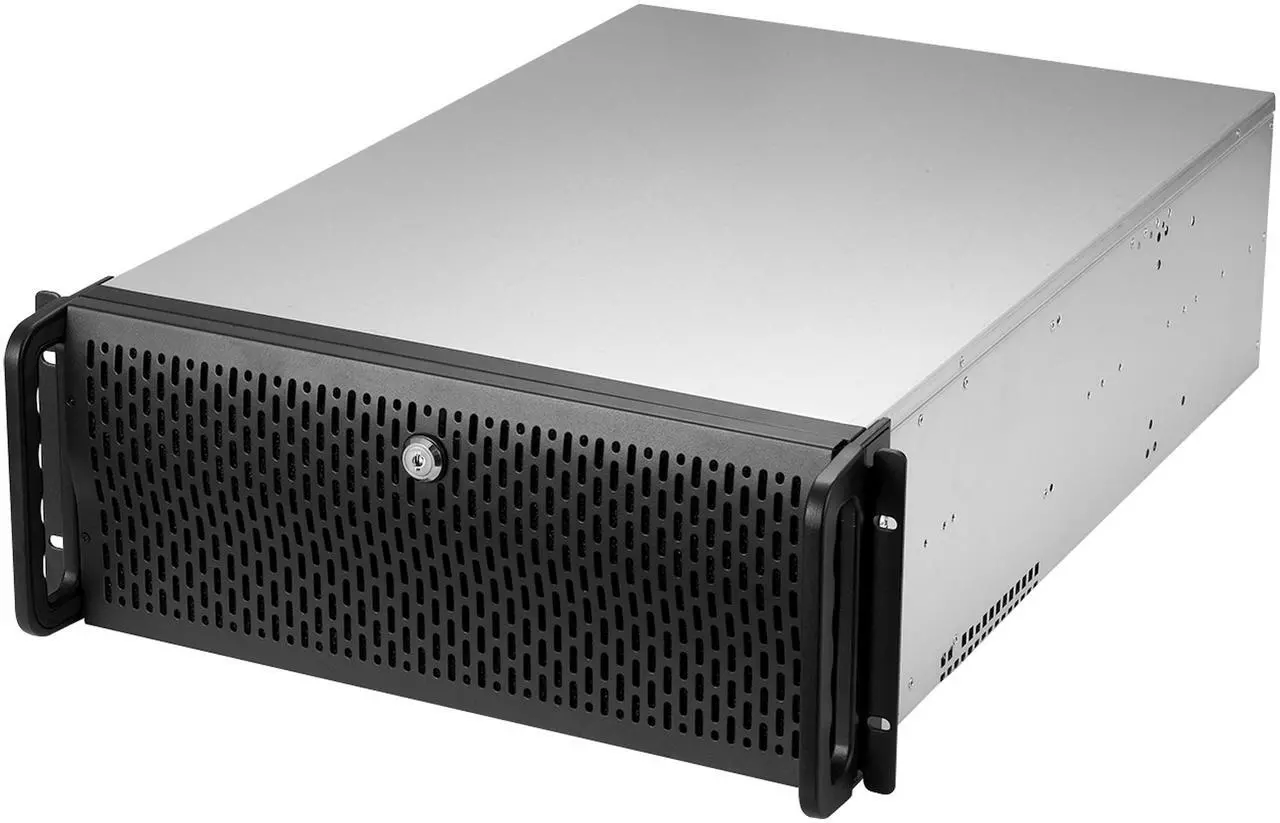
Rosewill 4U Server Chassis

In 2025, Rosewill introduced two families of full-tower chassis targeted at the network-attached storage and home server market: the Thor NAS series, announced in June, and the Hearth NAS series, announced in July. Both families adopt an upright desktop form factor rather than the standard 19-inch rackmount orientation common to dedicated NAS enclosures, which limits their compatibility with server racks but allows placement without a dedicated rack cabinet.

== Reception and reputation ==
Rosewill's reception within the PC hardware community has evolved over time and varies significantly by product category.

The brand's early power supply units attracted criticism for inconsistent quality, with some units considered overrated relative to their actual output capabilities. Beginning with the introduction of the Hive and Capstone series, and later the Tachyon line, Rosewill power supply units received more favorable assessments from technical reviewers. The Tachyon 1000W, for example, earned a positive review from Overclockers.com, which noted that the unit performed well despite the reviewer's initial skepticism toward the brand.

Rosewill's computer cases have generally been received more favorably than its early power supply units, with users on Tom's Hardware and other forums noting their value at price points between $40 and $80. Community discussion on forums such as HardForum and AnandTech Forums has frequently characterized Rosewill as a brand suited to budget builds where cost is the primary constraint, while advising against relying on brand reputation as a substitute for researching individual models.

== See also ==
- Newegg
- Private Label
- Original equipment manufacturer
