= Open Market =

Massachusetts e-commerce company

- Traded as: Nasdaq: OMKT
- Industry: Ecommerce
- Founded: 1994
- Founders: David B. Gifford and Shikhar Ghosh
- Defunct: 2003
- Fate: Acquired
- Headquarters: Burlington, Massachusetts
- Key people: Shikhar Ghosh, Chairman; Gary B. Eichhorn, CEO

Open Market was an ecommerce software startup, founded in Cambridge, Massachusetts in early 1994. It went public in 1996 on the Nasdaq exchange under the symbol OMKT as one of the first ecommerce IPOs. The stock more than doubled on its first day of trading, ending with a $1.2 billion market capitalization. It relocated to Burlington, Massachusetts in early 1998.

In 1999, Open Market acquired Future Tense, founded in 1995, to combine its ecommerce software with Future Tense's content management system.

Open Market was later acquired by Divine in 2001 for about $59 million. Divine later filed for bankruptcy in early 2003. In the same year, Soverain Software acquired Open Market's ecommerce assets, including the TRANSACT product. FatWire Software acquired Open Market's content management business from the Divine bankruptcy. FatWire, extended the Open Market software and serviced Open Market's original content management customer base.

FatWire was acquired in 2011 by Oracle, and OpenMarket's content Management is now branded as Oracle WebCenter Sites. Oracle now services FatWire's original customer base.

== Products and technology ==
Open Market developed a number of software products, including:

- Open Market Web Server: One of the first commercially available Web (HTTP) servers, and the first commercial product with a highly scalable threading architecture. The Secure Web Server variant added support for Secure HTTP (S-HTTP) and SSL.
- Transact: Open Market's eCommerce product. Notable for the use of cryptography to support digital offers and digital receipts with useful properties for eCommerce applications
- OM Express: An early offline web browser
- OM Axcess: A centralized access management tool for websites
- OM e-Business Suite: The WCM Software acquired from FutureTense and greatly extended

Open Market also invented FastCGI, a high-performance variant of the CGI interface. FastCGI was first implemented in Open Market's Web server products, but versions have since been developed for many other Web servers.

OpenMarket also owned patents for the shopping cart filed in 1994, session identifiers filed in 1998, and credit card payments over the internet filed in 1998.
