= Newegg =

American online electronics retailer

Newegg Commerce, Inc.
- Type: Public
- Traded as: Nasdaq: NEGG
- Industry: E-Commerce; Computer hardware; Consumer electronics; AI Infrastructure & enterprise; Technology
- Founded: 2001; 25 years ago
- Founder: Fred Chang
- Headquarters: Diamond Bar, California, U.S.
- Area served: Worldwide
- Key people: Anthony Chow (CEO); Zhitao He (chairman)
- Products: Computer hardware, components, and custom-built systems; PC peripherals; gaming hardware; servers and enterprise workstations
- Revenue: ▲US$1.44 billion (2025)
- Operating income: ▲US$−9.5 million (2025)
- Net income: ▲US$−4.9 million (2025)
- Total assets: ▲US$468.9 million (2025)
- Total equity: ▲US$160.7 million (2025)
- Number of employees: 714 (December 2025)
- Parent: Mr. Zhitao (Chairman and CEO of Hangzhou Lianluo)
- Website: www.newegg.com

Newegg Commerce, Inc. is an American online retailer of computer hardware, consumer electronics, and related technology products, headquartered in Diamond Bar, California. Founded in 2001 by Fred Chang, it grew into one of the largest technology-focused e-commerce retailers in North America, known for its enthusiast and PC-builder customer base and its private-label brands Rosewill and ABS.

The company operates a first-party online store and a third-party marketplace, and has expanded beyond computer components into consumer electronics, gaming, and enterprise technology, including servers, workstations, and AI-focused hardware through Newegg Business, alongside business-to-business.

== History ==
=== Early years and growth ===
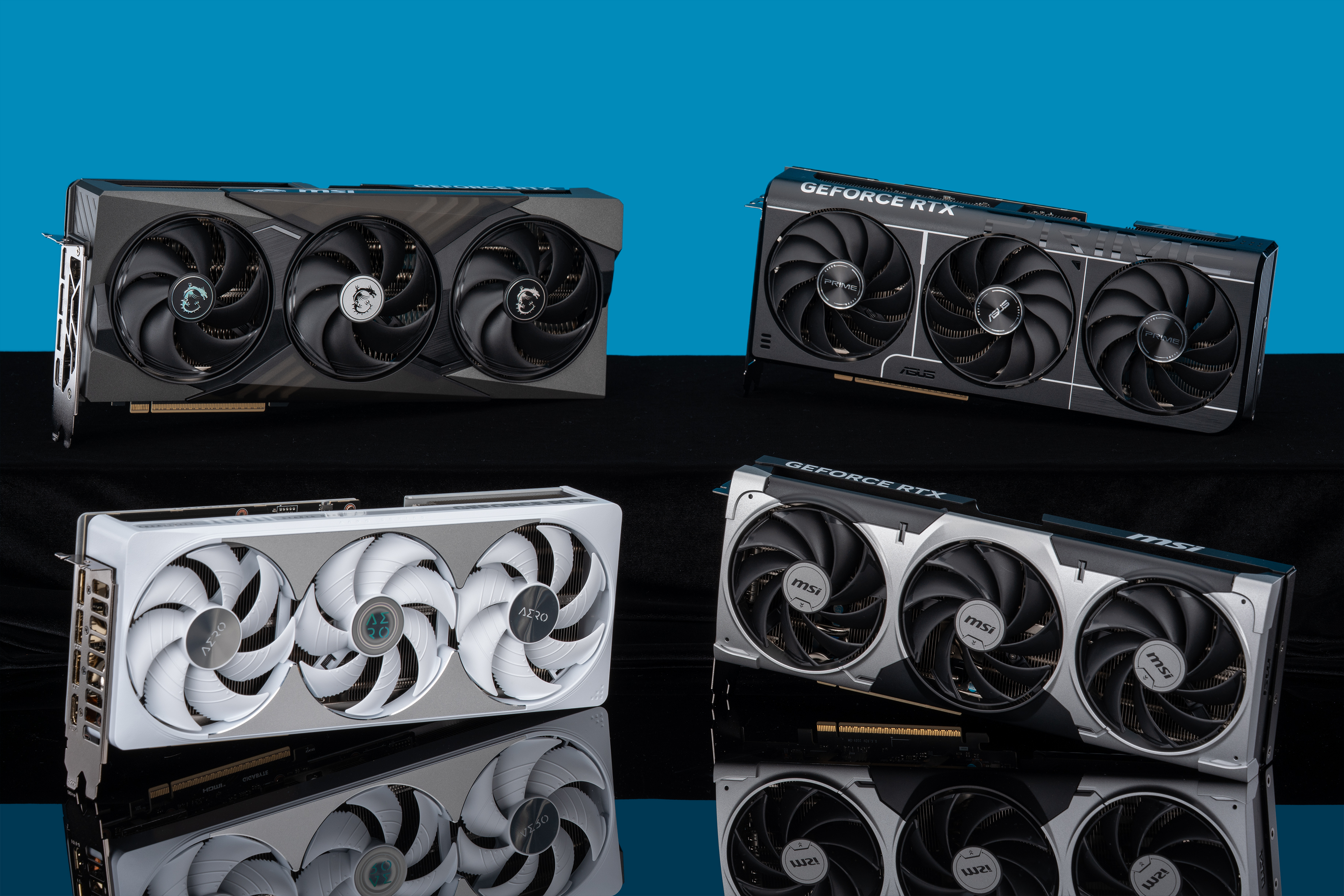
NVIDIA GeForce RTX 50 Series GPUs

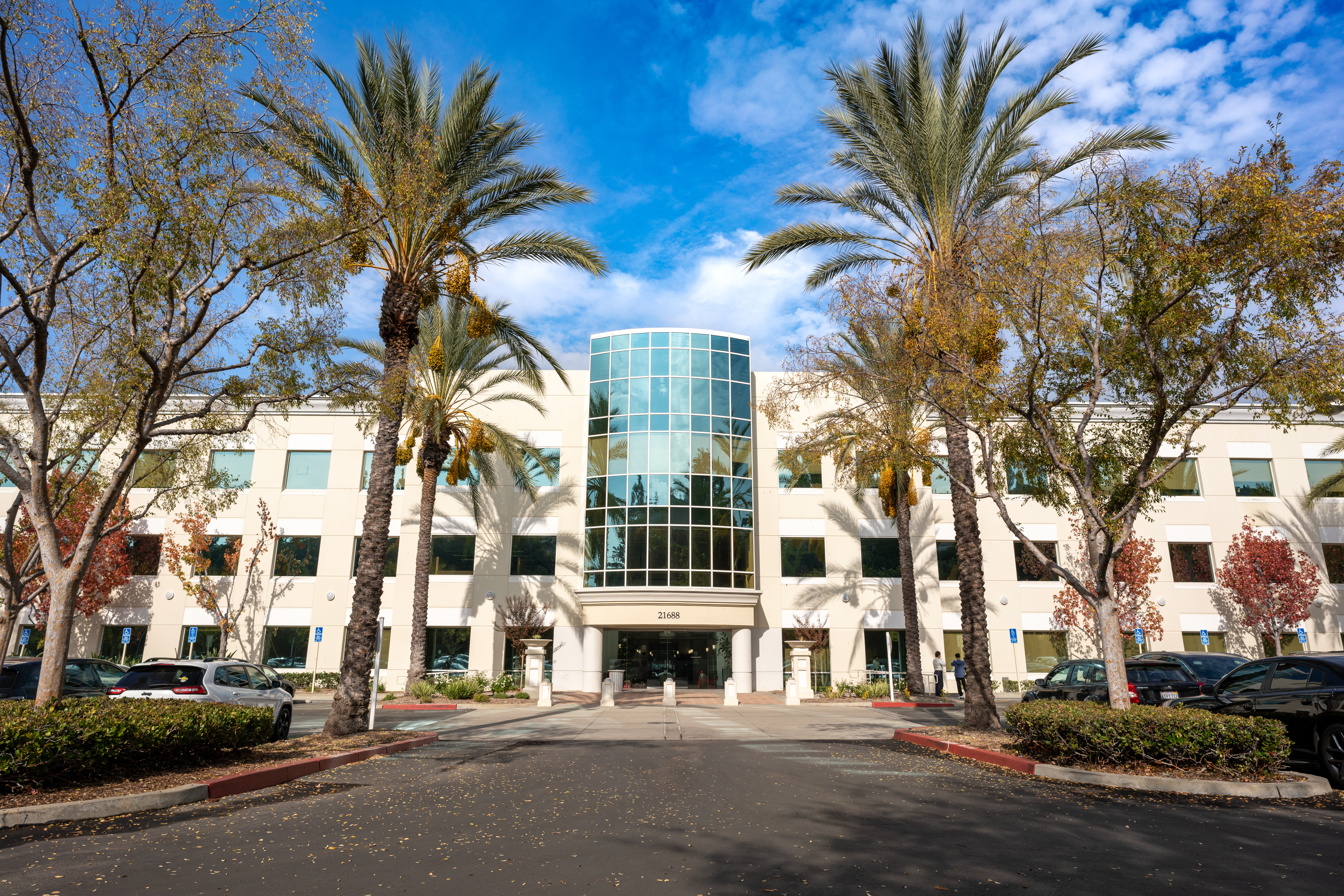
Newegg headquarters in Diamond Bar, California

The company was founded by Fred Chang, a U.S. immigrant from Taiwan, in 2001. "Newegg" was selected as the company name to signify new hope for e-commerce during a period when e-commerce businesses were struggling to survive.

Between 2001 and 2004 Newegg grew fast and was already profitable.

In 2004, Newegg established Rosewill as a private-label reseller of computing and household products from many manufacturers.

In 2005, Newegg.com was named one of the Internet's Top 10 retailers by Internet Retailer Magazine, with a 2004 sales revenue of just under $1 billion. Newegg.com grew an additional 30% in 2005, bringing annual sales to approximately $1.3 billion. Newegg launched NeweggMall.com in July 2008, Newegg.ca in October 2008, and NeweggBusiness.com in August 2009. In 2009, it was listed as No. 234 on Forbes America's Largest Private Companies list.

Chang had been Newegg's chairman and CEO until August 1, 2008, when it was announced he would step down as CEO and chairman while remaining a member of the board of directors and executive committee. He was succeeded by Tally Liu. Chang also retained his position as president of Newegg's Chinese operations.

=== Attempted 2009 IPO and Newegg Marketplace ===
On September 28, 2009, Newegg Inc filed for an IPO (initial public offering) with the U.S. Securities and Exchange Commission. The filing stated that Newegg has been profitable every year since 2001 and generated sales of $2.1 billion in 2008. The company's largest outside shareholder is New York-based venture-capital firm Insight Venture Partners. The IPO was managed by JP Morgan, Bank of America, Merrill Lynch, and Citi. In 2011, the company withdrew its registration for filing for an IPO, saying it would continue to explore alternative options for funding.

It launched Newegg Marketplace in 2010 and exceeded $2.5 billion in revenue that year. The company has more than 1,500 employees.

In 2010, Liu departed, and Chang became CEO again. In 2020, Anthony Chow became CEO.

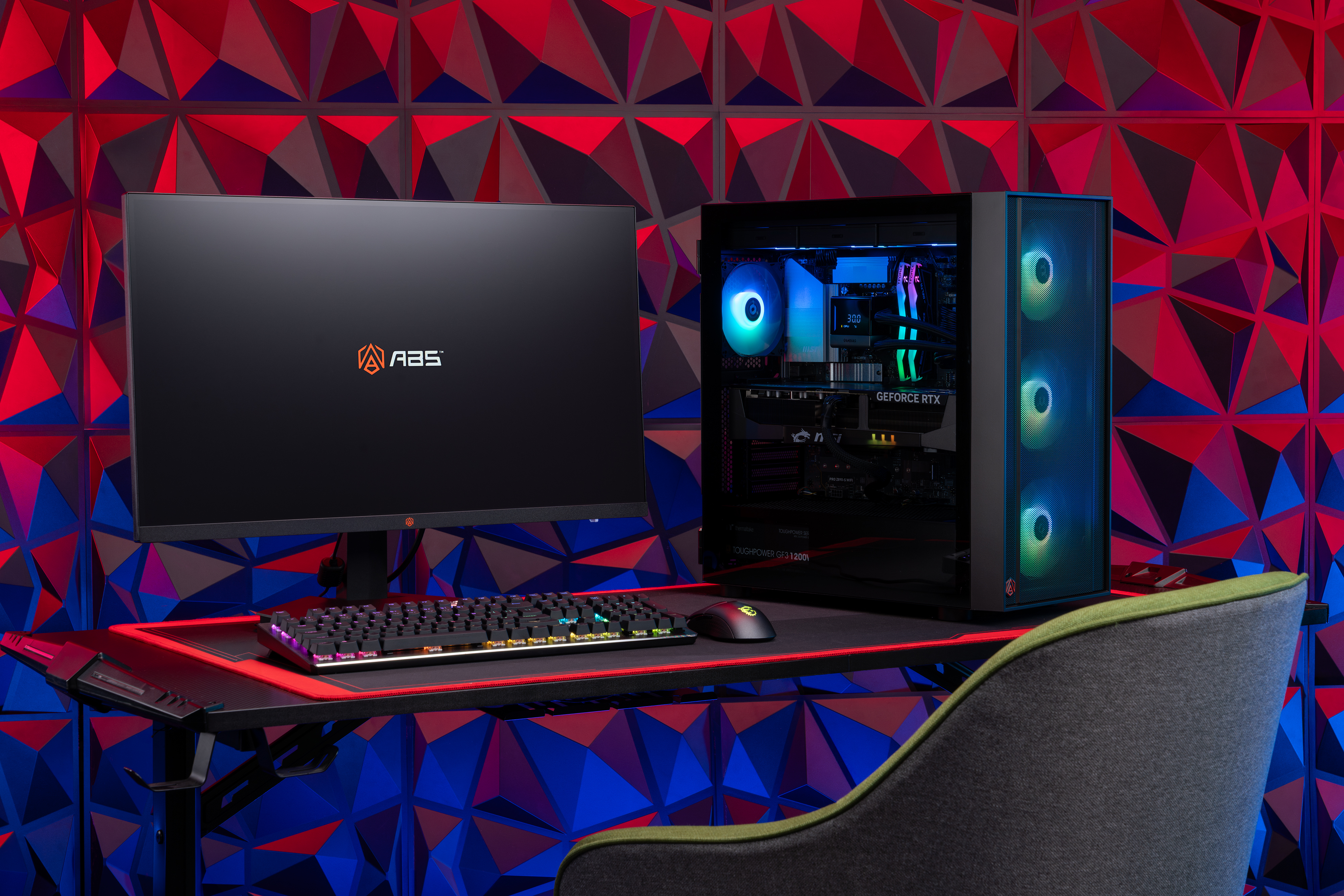
Custom ABS PC and monitor setup

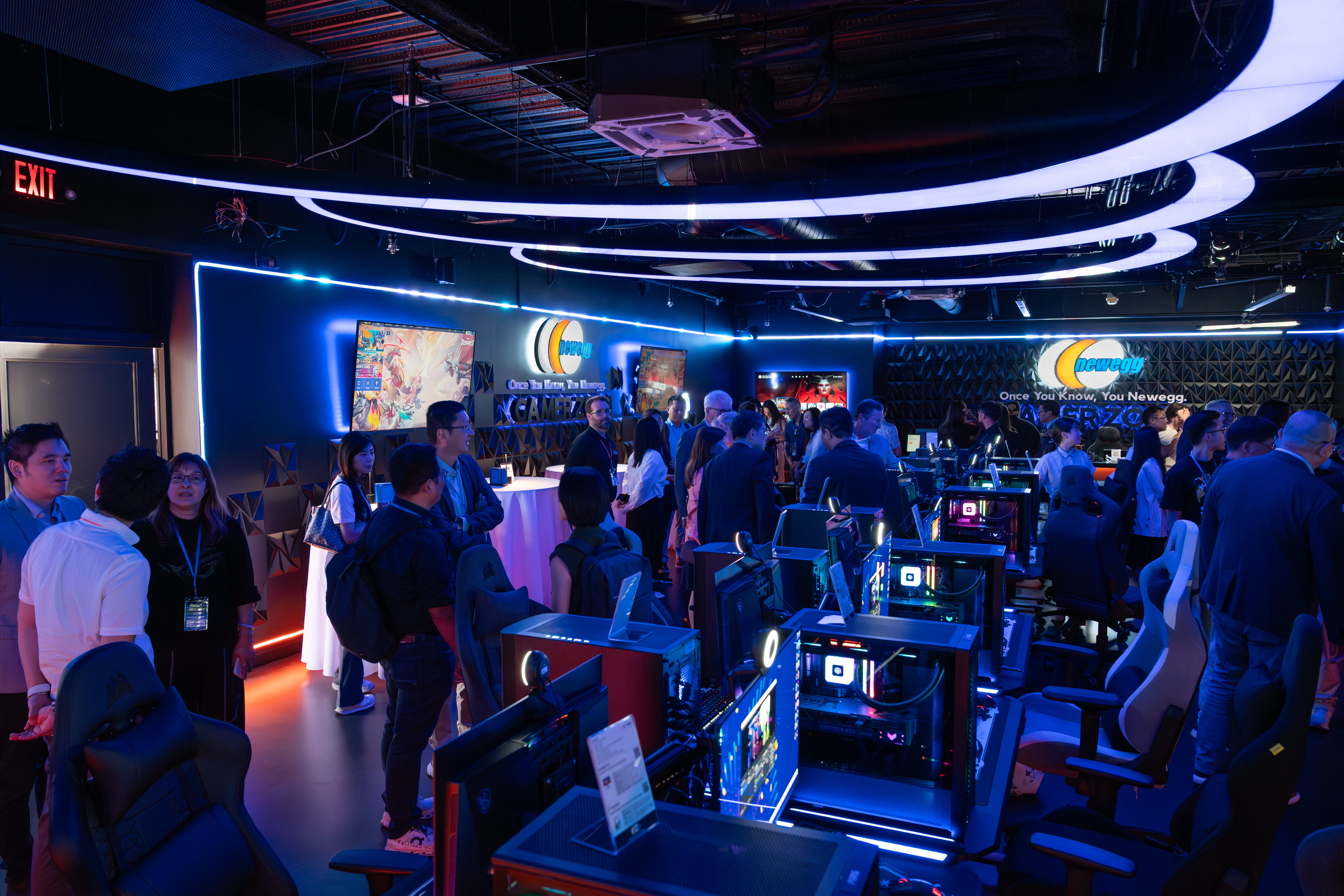
Newegg Gamer Zone at Newegg Headquarters

=== Subsequent expansion ===
On June 15, 2017, during London Tech Week, Newegg announced a global expansion plan to serve key parts of Asia Pacific, Europe, Latin America, and the Middle East. Once complete, the online retailer is expected to reach customers in a total of 50 countries. On November 2, 2017, the company announced key global milestones, including localized payment options, enhanced customer service, and a greater product selection for its international customers.

=== Liaison Interactive buyout and SPAC merger ===
In 2016, Hangzhou Liaison Interactive Information Technology Co. (SZSE: 002280), a Chinese technology company, acquired a majority stake in Newegg in an investment deal. In 2020, Newegg entered into a merger agreement with Beijing, China based Lianlou Smart Limited (NASDAQ: LLIT), a Chinese special-purpose acquisition company, wherein Newegg stockholders became majority owners of LLIT. Following the consummation of the merger, Newegg was listed as a publicly traded company on Nasdaq (NASDAQ: NEGG) in May 2021 as Newegg Commerce, Inc.

== Services ==
In November 2016, Newegg announced a new checkout feature that lets Newegg.com customers choose to have their package held for pickup at one of more than 2,500 FedEx Corp. locations, including 1,800 FedEx retail stores.

In January 2017, Indiegogo and Newegg announced a partnership whereby Newegg provides select crowdfunding campaigns with social exposure; guidance on go-to-market and sales strategies; and assistance with order fulfillment, shipping, and logistical options to help get their products into customer's hands quickly and efficiently.

In May 2017, Newegg formally rolled out Newegg Logistics, designed to help B2C and B2B e-commerce sellers and other organizations streamline order fulfillment, shipment, and returns.

In October 2017, Newegg unveiled Newegg Now, a weekly Livestream featuring tech commentary and reviews, as well as time-sensitive deals available exclusively during each Newegg Now broadcast.

In February 2019, Newegg announced a program called Newegg online work. Employees interested in part-time work are selected at random to make purchases.

In May 2020, Newegg formally launched a direct-to-consumer (D2C) initiative to help its vendor partners maximize their reach within the Newegg platform.

In June 2020, Newegg introduced the Newegg PC Builder, an online configurator that lets customers configure and source all the components needed to build a custom PC. While the June 2020 release was limited to customers in North America, in August 2020, the company expanded the configurator to the countries it serves in Europe, Asia Pacific, Latin America, and the Middle East.

In February 2021, Newegg announced a program called Newegg Shuffle, where consumers interested in hot tech devices are chosen at random to make a purchase.

In May 2021, Newegg launched an automotive category offering with a vehicle-specific year/make/model/options navigation interface.

In June 2022, Newegg debuted Gaming PC Finder, a personalization tool to evaluate gaming PC specs, components, and performance options.

In July 2022, Newegg launched JustGPU.com, a research and e-commerce site dedicated to graphics cards. The site allows customers to evaluate, review and compare GPU details to consider a purchase.

In August 2022, Newegg deployed Laptop Finder, a tool to help shoppers narrow down laptop purchases by need and budget.

Newegg offers services to its third-party logistics (3PL) clients and other e-commerce companies. In April 2020, Newegg announced Newegg Staffing, a staffing agency serving the logistics, manufacturing, clerical, and supply chain management industries. In August 2020, the company expanded its in-house staffing agency to the Midwest and East Coast with new locations in Indianapolis, Indiana, and Edison, New Jersey. And in June 2020, Newegg established Newegg Bridge, which provides customer service management and social media monitoring to its 3PL clients.

In March 2023, Newegg launched NAS Builder, a configurator for network-attached-storage systems that lets shoppers select and price out compatible NAS hardware.

In May 2023, Newegg's ChatGPT integration for its PC Builder tool surpassed 200,000 user prompts during open beta, and in July 2023 the company launched a standalone ChatGPT plugin, described as the first computer-shopping ChatGPT plugin, to give AI-assisted compatibility checked PC building recommendations.

In April 2024, Newegg created Newegg+, a free customer membership program. Members will gain access to perks like free shipping and exclusive deals.

In June 2024, Newegg announced - SellingPilot, a new SaaS multichannel marketplace management solution for sellers.

In June 2025, Newegg debuts Gamer Community, its own community platform for gamers and will serve up news and discussion topics, along with polling, advice and places for participants to show off their custom setups.

In August 2025, Newegg unveiled the Newegg Gamer Zone, a state-of-the-art gaming arena at company headquarters. In March 10, 2026, Newegg opened the Gamer Zone to the public.

In June 2026, Newegg launched the Newegg AI shopping assistant, a fully conversational AI shopping assistant.

=== Controversies ===
In March 2010, Newegg sold 300 counterfeit Intel Core i7-920 CPUs. The problem was first exposed by a member of the website HardOCP who posted on the site's forum about receiving the fake CPU. Newegg at first released a statement saying that the processors were "demo units", but later said that they discovered that the processors were actually counterfeit and that the company was terminating its relationship with one supplier in response. The company offered replacement units to the customers who received counterfeit processors, while Intel stated that they had been made aware of the problem and were investigating as well.

In early 2018, customers in the state of Connecticut were notified that Newegg had not collected state sales tax due on out-of-state purchases in the past three years. Newegg was given a choice of collecting such tax in the future or turning over customer information to the state's Department of Revenue Services, which would require customers to file a sales tax form for the past three years of purchases. Newegg chose to furnish the customer information; as Newegg did not have a physical presence in Connecticut, Newegg believed it did not need to collect state sales tax from the ruling in Quill Corp. v. North Dakota. Connecticut's Department of Revenue Services later issued tax bills to these customers.

In September 2018, Newegg announced that malicious code had been placed on their servers for over a month, allowing hackers to access customers' credit card information upon checkout.

=== 2022 Gamers Nexus RMA and open-box controversy ===
In February 2022, the YouTube channel Gamers Nexus published a video titled "Newegg Scammed Us," detailing its experience with Newegg's returns and open-box practices. The channel’s editor-in-chief, Steve Burke, purchased a motherboard from Newegg and later returned it unopened, as he no longer required it. Newegg refused the refund, claiming that the motherboard had been damaged by the customer. After the case became public, the board was returned to Burke and the refund issued. Upon inspection, the motherboard bore a manufacturer RMA sticker from Gigabyte, and according to a Gigabyte representative, the company had quoted Newegg a repair cost of US $100, which Newegg declined to pay before reselling the known defective board as working open-box.

Following publication, other reviewers and customers reported similar experiences in which Newegg allegedly refused to process returns or refunds on multiple occasions, often citing damage to items that had been returned in unopened or unused condition.

In response, Newegg issued a public apology, attributing the issue to "unintentional process errors and isolated incidents." The company announced a new "no-questions-asked" return policy for open-box CPUs and motherboards, which was later expanded to include other open-box product categories.

== Gaming and esports ==
Newegg has sponsored gaming tournaments for titles including Counter-Strike, Warcraft III, and Rome: Total War. Newegg had a monthly case mod contest in 2005 in which contestants submitted pictures, descriptions, and directions describing how to personalize their computers with esoteric appearances and functions.

In March 2019, esports entertainment company Allied Esports named Newegg a founding partner and the official e-commerce partner of the HyperX Esports Arena in Las Vegas, Nevada. In June 2019, Newegg and Allied Esports co-hosted the Triple Crown Royale at the HyperX Esports Arena Las Vegas. Participants competed in three popular titles: Apex Legends, Fortnite, and PlayerUnknown's Battlegrounds (PUBG). The competition gave select members of the public the opportunity to compete against professional players from Counter Logic Gaming (CLG), including Marksman & Psalm from the CLG Fortnite team, and Emy & GooseBreeder from the CLG CS: GO, Red team. In January 2020, Counter Logic Gaming announced an expanded partnership with Newegg as CLG's presenting partner and online technology retail partner for its North American League of Legends Championship Series (LCS) team.

In October 2020, Newegg relaunched its hardware subsidiary ABS to focus on the gaming community. ABS (also known as Advanced Battlestations) offers a range of gaming PCs.

In December 2025, Newegg hosted AMD and Evil Geniuses for a Valorant tournament. Fans were able to play 1 vs 1’s against pros and experience their skills in person. In March 2026, Evil Geniuses hosted a collegiate eSports tournament with Loyola Marymount University (LMU), University of Southern California (USC), University of San Diego (UCSD), and California State University, Long Beach (CSULB).

== Litigation ==
=== Patent troll cases ===
Newegg has become known as a company that fights "patent trolls".

In January 2013, Newegg won a victory over Soverain Software when the Court of Appeals for the Federal Circuit overturned the district court ruling in favor of Soverain and invalidated a shopping cart patent by citing prior art from 1984, CompuServe’s Electronic Mall. On January 13, 2014, the Supreme Court refused Soverain Software's petition for a writ of certiorari to rehear a January 2013 decision of the Court of Appeals, effectively ending Soverain's case.

In November 2013, Newegg lost a case in Texas against TQP Development over Newegg's use of https:// protocol mixing SSL and RC4. Whitfield Diffie and Ron Rivest, the inventors of public-key cryptography and RC4 encryption respectively, testified for Newegg.

On July 6, 2015, after 20 months of waiting, Newegg filed an extraordinary petition urging US District Judge Rodney Gilstrap to issue judgment so that they would be able to file an appeal. On July 15, 2015, Gilstrap ruled that Newegg did not infringe on a patent belonging to TQP Development.

== Awards ==
Newegg Inc., a Fortune 500 technology company and one of the largest e-commerce retailers of computer hardware, consumer electronics and technology products in North America, has received recognition from major industry publications and consumer research organizations. Below is a chronological record of Newegg's most notable awards and rankings, current through 2025.

Recent recognition (2023-2025)

In 2025, Newegg was named to USA Today's Best Customer Service list and USA Today's Best Stores list, and it received a Best Collaboration award from Rakuten. In 2024, Newegg ranked among the top 10 largest online marketplaces in the United States according to Webretailer, placed in the top 100 largest North American online retailers by web sales in the Digital Commerce 360 rankings, and was included in USA Today's list of America's Customer Service Champions. In 2023, Newsweek named Newegg to its list of the Best Online Shops.

Industry and multichannel recognition (2019–2021)

Multichannel Merchant recognized Newegg as a top Third-Party Logistics (3PL) Provider in both 2020 and 2021. Newsweek included Newegg in its list of America's Best Loyalty Programs in 2021 and ranked Newegg 5th among Best Online Shops in the consumer electronics category in 2020. Digital Commerce 360 ranked Newegg 6th in its Top 500 consumer electronics category and 26th overall in its 2020 Top 500 list. In 2019, Newegg was ranked 10th in the TWICE Top 100 recognized by Multiorders as one of the most popular online marketplaces.

Customer service and operational awards (2017–2018)

The National Customer Service Association gave Newegg its NCSA All-Star Award for Customer Service Organization of the Year (Large Business) in 2018. Multichannel Merchant named Newegg to its list of top 3PL providers in 2017, and Internet Retailer ranked Newegg 21st on its list of the Top 100 Consumer Electronics E-Retailers the same year. B2B E-Commerce World ranked Newegg 107th in its 2018 B2B E-Commerce 300.

Earlier milestones (2003–2011)

Newegg's early recognition includes multiple Computer Shopper Shopper's Choice Awards (2003-2011) and a Forbes.com Best of the Web honor. Newegg was ranked the 12th largest consumer electronics dealer by TWICE/Stevenson Company in 2010 and 18th in 2007. The Los Angeles Business Journal named Newegg a Top 100 Fastest Growing Private Company in 2006 and 2007, and Forbes ranked Newegg 234th on its list of Largest Private Companies in America in 2009. Internet Retailer placed Newegg in the Top 10 Largest Internet Retailers in 2007.
