= FatWire =

FatWire Software
- Type: Private
- Industry: Software & Web Content Management & Web 2.0 Collaboration
- Founded: New York City, USA (1996)
- Founders: Mark Fasciano, Ari Kahn
- Successor: Oracle Corporation (acquired FatWire 2011)
- Headquarters: Mineola, New York
- Key people: Yogesh Gupta, CEO
- Products: FatWire Content Server; FatWire TeamUp; FatWire Analytics; FatWire Engage; FatWire Community Server; FatWire Gadget Server; FatWire Mobility Server; FatWire Content Integration Platform
- Number of employees: 200 (2008)
- Website: Oracle and FatWire

FatWire Software was a privately held company selling web content management system (CMS) software. It was acquired by Oracle Corporation in 2011, and its products rolled up into Oracle's WebCenter product lines.

== History ==
- 1996: Established by Mark Fasciano, Ari Kahn and John Murcott,
- 2003: Acquired Open Market's Enterprise web content management assets including Content Server from divine, founded as FutureTense.
- 2004: Launched Content Server 6.0 WCM software
- 2007: Yogesh Gupta was named president and CEO in August, acquired Infostoria in October, launched their strategy for Web Experience Management in November.
- 2010: FatWire and EMC Corporation announced a partnership in which EMC will resell FatWire's products as their strategic Web Experience Management solution. In return FatWire acquired the rights to resell EMC's digital asset management software
- 2011: On June 21, 2011, Oracle announced it was acquiring FatWire Software. In July 2011, Oracle purchased Fatwire for $163 million with the assistance of Bingham McCutchen
- 2012: In February 2012 Oracle releases Oracle WebCenter 11gR1 (11.1.1.6.0) incorporating WebCenter Sites – the new name for Fatwire Content Server.

== Market ==
FatWire's revenue for 2009 has been estimated to be around $40M by Real Story Group.
