= Soverain Software =

Commerce technology company

Soverain Software LLC was a Chicago-based company which owned patents for its ecommerce technology products. The company held patents for digital shopping carts commonly used on e-commerce websites, such as Amazon.com and collected royalties on these patents, but ultimately their patents were invalidated. Soverain Software has been characterized as a patent troll.

Soverain also claimed to own, sell, and maintain an enterprise software product called Transact, which, according to the company, had existed for nearly 18 years and had been used by over 1,000 customers in over 25 countries, including companies such as Time-Warner, AT&T, Sony, Disney, BusinessWeek and Reuters. However, this is disputed, and no evidence that the company ever developed or sold software products is known to exist.

== History ==
In 2003, Soverain Software acquired some of the assets of bankrupt Divine, a Chicago software firm which itself had acquired Open Market, a Boston internet startup, in 2001. Among the assets acquired were the e-commerce software product Transact, and various patents, including patents on the "electronic shopping cart" – essentially, patents on the idea of having a "shopping cart" in which to save items to be purchased in a single transaction, rather than having to purchase each item as an individual transaction.

Soverain did not further develop or market Transact, but instead focusing its business model on enforcing their patents.

=== Patent infringement lawsuits ===
On January 12, 2004, Soverain sued Amazon.com and Gap Inc. in the U.S. District Court for the Eastern District of Texas. Gap settled with Soverain in February 2005 under undisclosed terms. In August that year, Amazon settled the case for $40 million. One of the patents involved a shopping cart mechanism used for online shopping.

In 2010, Soverain Software filed a suit against several e-commerce companies, including Nordstrom, Macy's, Home Depot, Radioshack, Kohl's and Newegg alleging infringement of U.S. Patents No. 5,715,314 , No. 5,909,492 and No. 7,272,639 which relate to the concept of a digital shopping cart, similar to the 2004 case. When the case went to court in 2010, all defendants except Newegg had settled. Initially, Newegg was found to have infringed the patents in suit and Soverain was awarded a judgement of $2.5 million fine instead of the $34 million claimed by Soverain.

On January 22, 2013, the U.S. Court of Appeals for the Federal Circuit reversed the district court and invalidated claims from all three asserted patents as being obvious in view of the prior art. The judgment against Newegg was vacated. The ruling of invalidity put a stay on the remaining lawsuits in progress.

On October 16, 2013, Soverain filed a petition for a writ of certiorari in Soverain v. Newegg to request a hearing with the Supreme Court of the United States. Three amicus briefs were filed by i4i, Professor Eileen Herlihy and MDB Capital who supported Soverain's petition. On January 13, 2014, The Supreme Court denied the petition.

On February 13, 2015, a U.S. Court of appeals invalidated Soverain's previous victories over Avon and Victoria's Secret. On March 30, 2015, US District Judge Leonard Davis declared invalid the last of Soverain's patents, after which the company had no substantive assets.

== See also ==
- Open Market
- Newegg
