= NZXT =

American computer hardware manufacturer

NZXT, Inc.
- Type: Private
- Industry: Computer hardware
- Founded: 2004; 22 years ago
- Founder: Johnny Hou
- Headquarters: Monrovia, California, United States
- Key people: Johnny Hou
- Products: Computer cases; Power supply units; Computer fans; Water cooling; RGB LED lighting; Motherboards; Headphones; Gaming chair; Mousepads
- Website: nzxt.com

NZXT, Inc. is an American computer hardware manufacturer based in Los Angeles, California. The company manufactures computer cases, components, and accessories for the PC gaming market.

The company has faced controversy surrounding its Flex PC rental program, which has drawn criticism for alleged anti-consumer practices, misleading specifications, and pricing structures. This has led to significant backlash from the gaming community.

== History ==
NZXT was founded in 2004 by Johnny Hou to produce products specifically for the DIY PC building community. The company's first product was the NZXT Guardian, which was a case featuring a plastic front bezel resembling Transformers toys and lighting effects. Over time, it gradually expanded to other categories of computer hardware including computer power supplies, computer cooling, motherboards, and streaming devices.

On July 30, 2024, NZXT offered PC rentals. Scharon Harding of Ars Technica noted that the service did not allow for ownership, and over a two year upgrade cycle, would cost as much as "a quality PC that you could own and continue getting value from beyond two years." Michael Crider of PCWorld raised similar concerns about pricing, however noted it could be an option for people who could not afford a "top-notch gaming PC".

On November 30, 2024, YouTube channel Gamers Nexus criticized the Flex rental program for false advertising claims, rapidly changing prices and specifications, without changing model names and related performance benchmarks, and anti-consumer terms of service, which would allegedly allow the company to sell the data stored in the rented computer. The channel would also drop NZXT as an advertiser, cancelling an ongoing advertising contract. Further accusations involve targeting minors via focused social media video advertises and without properly verifying the applicant ID before starting the renting program. NZXT shared a social media post in response that it is aware of the claims made.

== Products ==
NZXT is most known for its computer cases, but also sells motherboards, power supplies, cooling products, LED lighting, and other accessories marketed towards PC gamers. The company designs and develops their products in Los Angeles, with manufacturing being in Shenzhen.

=== Cases ===
NZXT has been making PC cases since 2003, when it released the Guardian. In 2013, the Phantom 630, 530, and 410 were released.

The S340 was released in 2016 and later featured a collaboration with Razer. The S340 was refreshed in 2016 with the S340 Elite, which featured a tempered glass side panel instead of the acrylic panel of the previous S340. A limited Hyper Beast edition of the S340 Elite was later released. Also in 2016, NZXT released the Manta - A mini-ITX chassis that featured radically different design compared to its case lineup at the time. Later NZXT and Razer stopped their partnership though.

A new line of cases was released in October 2017, consisting of the H700, H400, and the H200. They are minimalist in design, and are constructed from steel with tempered glass side panels. The "i" variants of each case come with decorative LED lighting and a fan controller.

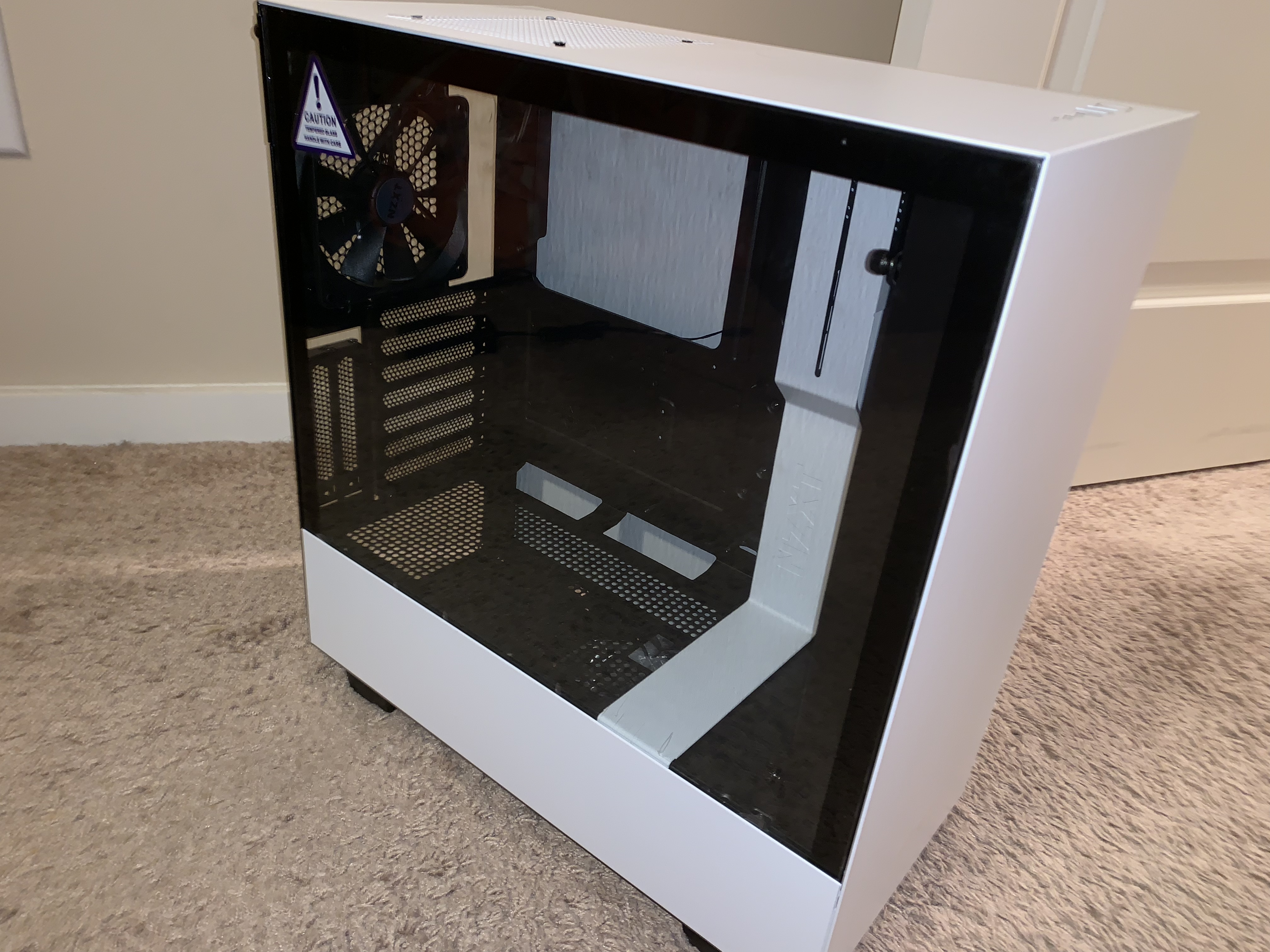
An empty H500i case

A cheaper case, the H500, was added to the lineup in May 2018.

The H-series cases were refreshed in May 2019. The new revisions introduced a front-panel USB-C port. One of the refreshed cases, the H510 Elite, added a second glass panel on the front of the case.

In February 2020, NZXT released the H1 compact form factor case. Several months later reports began to emerge of H1 cases catching fire, which were first reported on November 30, 2020, by Gamers Nexus, a PC hobbyist YouTube channel. On February 2, 2021, NZXT removed the H1 case from its product lineup, until a permanent solution could be made.

=== Cooling ===
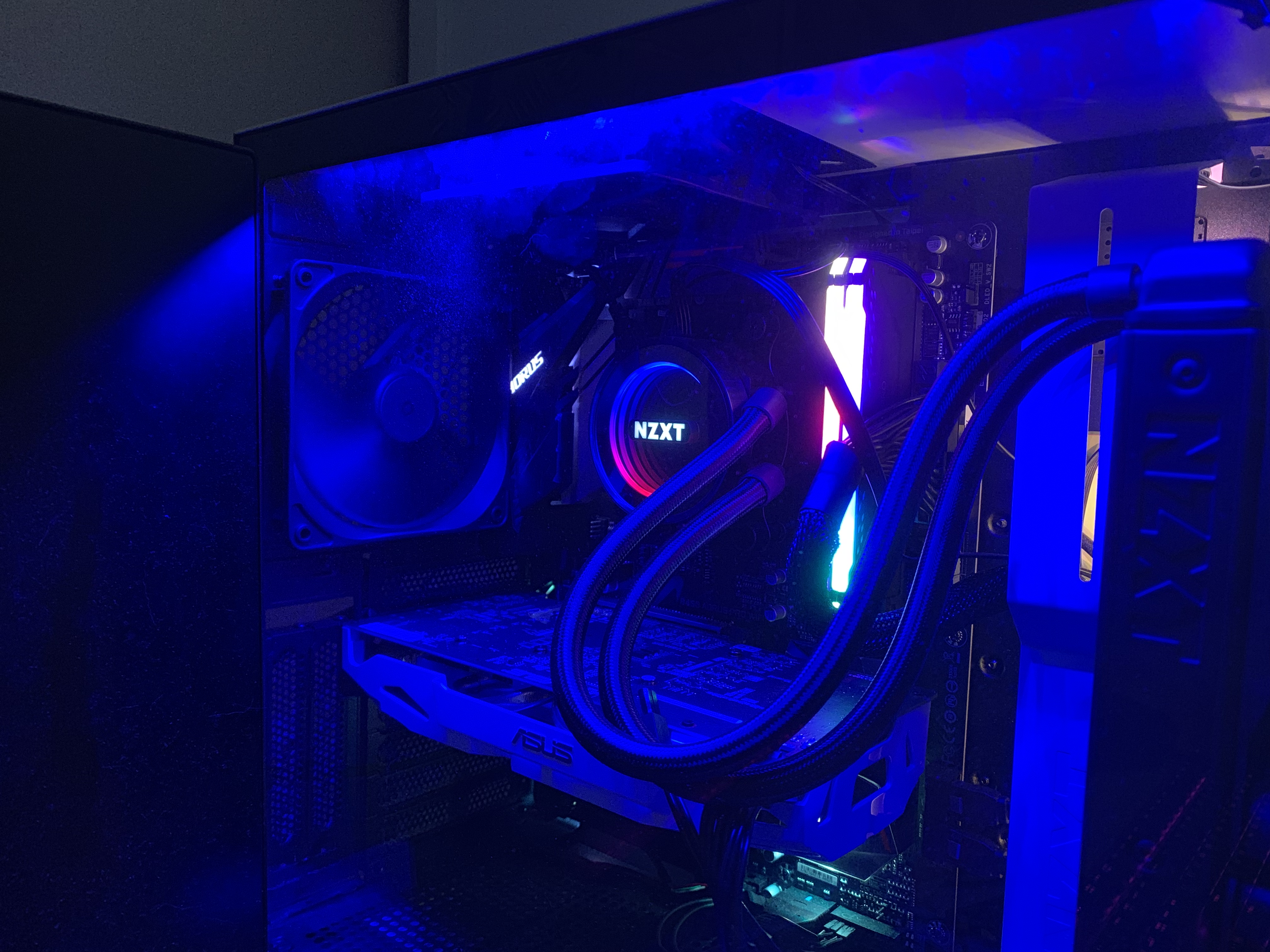
An NZXT X52 240mm water cooler

NZXT has multiple all-in-one water cooler products under its Kraken lineup. The first of these was released in 2013, in both 140mm and 280mm sizes. NZXT has since released multiple updates to this lineup, including new coolers in 120mm and 360mm sizes, and improvements to the pumps and radiators. Most recently, it released a new cooler, the Z73, which includes a customizable LED display, and updates to the rest of its AIO lineup.

=== Motherboards ===
NZXT released its own line of motherboards for the Intel Z370 chipset in January 2018. It was praised for its minimalist design, as the circuitry is not exposed, but was initially criticized for its high price. The lineup was refreshed in October 2018 to support the Z390 chipset. The NZXT branded Z390 motherboards were manufactured by Elitegroup while a Z490 one is made by ASRock.

=== Power supply units ===
NZXT began selling power supply units in 2010, before ceasing sales of them in 2016. They re-entered the market in July 2018 with a series of modular digitally-controlled power supplies.

=== Lighting ===
NZXT started making its own line of lighting products including RGB & fan controllers, underglow, LED strips, RGB cable combs, and the hue 2 ambient v2 desktop lighting system.

=== CRFT ===
NZXT released the first product on its CRFT line, a series of themed limited edition PC cases, in May 2018. They first started with a partnership case with PlayerUnknown's Battlegrounds, before moving to a "Nuka-Cola" Fallout themed case with Bethesda Softworks. Another PUBG and Fallout series case were released as well as World of Warcraft and Tom Clancy's Rainbow Six themed cases.

=== Audio ===
NZXT started selling its line of audio products in November 2019; it released its headset, audio mixer, and headset stand.

=== Gaming accessories ===
NZXT introduced its line of gaming accessories starting with the puck in January 2017 used for cable management and a headset mount. They expanded it later to include mousepads, a sling bag, and mechanical keyboards.

== Services ==
=== BLD ===
In 2017, NZXT launched a computer building service called BLD. The service asks about what games would be played on it, budget constraints, and customization options before generating a PC build. The build is sold pre-assembled. They offer 4 categories of PC builds: Starter, Mini, Streaming, and Creator. In March 2023, NZXT revamped its brand of gaming computers into "Player".

==== Flex ====
In summer 2024, NZXT launched Flex, a computer rental service based on BLD. This service attracted substantial criticism and controversy over allegations of predatory rental fees, anti-consumer practices, and invasive data privacy policies. The company has since updated the branding of Flex and its computers to better separate BLD and Flex computers as they feature different components.

== See also ==
- List of computer hardware manufacturers
