= Alfalfa Club =

American social club

- Formation: 1913; 113 years ago
- Type: Club
- Purpose: Hosts annual banquet on the last Saturday of January
- Location: Washington, D.C.
- Members: ~200 politicians and corporate executives
- President: David Rubenstein (2020)
- Vice President: Jim Mattis

The Alfalfa Club is an American social club that exists only to hold an annual black tie banquet, in honor of Confederate general Robert E. Lee's birthday, on the last Saturday of January at the Capital Hilton in Washington D.C., with an after-party at a local restaurant. The banquet, which lasts 4 hours, features music by the United States Marine Band and a political roast. There are approximately 200 members of the club, all of them influential politicians and business executives. The club has an invitation system; members are required to be invited to join. Invitations are extended to prospective members annually to fill the spots of recently deceased members. Several United States presidents have been members of the club. The press is not allowed to attend the banquet.

The club was named in reference to the alfalfa plant's supposed willingness to "do anything for a drink".

If in attendance, the president is usually asked to deliver remarks at the banquet. George W. Bush spoke at the banquet in each year of his presidency; the Alfalfa Club was one of only three clubs that his father, George H. W. Bush, was a member of as president. Barack Obama attended and spoke at the banquet in 2009 and 2012. Donald Trump spoke at the banquet in 2026.

== History ==
In 1913, four southerners formed the Alfalfa Club in the Willard Hotel to celebrate the birthday of Confederate general Robert E. Lee. It began admitting Black people in 1974. In addition to its January banquet in Washington, the club previously held an annual summer picnic.

In 1986, William Rehnquist's membership in the club became the subject of discussion in a Senate Judiciary Committee hearing after he was nominated to be Chief Justice of the United States. Rehnquist described the club as one that "met once a year to listen to patriotic music and 'hear some funny political speeches'" and said "he did not think his membership in such a once-a-year group violated the canons of judicial ethics."

In 1994, after a boycott by President Bill Clinton over a lack of women in the club, the club admitted its first women members, Sandra Day O'Connor, Elizabeth Dole, and Katharine Graham. Graham's father, Eugene Meyer, had been a member. Clinton's boycott had been the first by a president since Jimmy Carter.

In 2009, President Barack Obama spoke at the club's annual dinner, saying, "This dinner began almost one hundred years ago as a way to celebrate the birthday of General Robert E. Lee. If he were here with us tonight, the General would be 202 years old. And very confused." Occupy D.C. protested the 2012 banquet.

President Donald Trump attended the dinner for the first time on January 31, 2026. In his speech, he joked about suing his then-nominee for the Chair of the Federal Reserve, Kevin Warsh, for lowering interest rates. Trump's speech, which included jokes about former senator Mitt Romney and Russian president Vladimir Putin, was reportedly poorly received by the audience. Many members of the second cabinet of Donald Trump and his advisors were in attendance, as well as World Economic Forum president Børge Brende and other American political figures. According to CNN, the Alfalfa Club's guest list that year included bipartisan figures that both supported and opposed Trump, reflecting its political diversity.

== Annual club president nomination ==
One of the evening's activities includes the playful nomination of a presidential candidate by the Club's leadership. The candidate is then required to make a speech. Several such candidates became President of the United States after being nominated, including Richard Nixon in 1965 (elected in 1968), Ronald Reagan in 1974 (elected in 1980), and George W. Bush in 1998 (elected in 2000). In 1969, it nominated Harold Stassen. Its 2000 nomination was Australian-born James Wolfensohn, constitutionally ineligible for election to the U.S. presidency. In 2001, the presidential nomination went to John McCain. In 2004, the Club nominated Jack Valenti, the former president of the Motion Picture Association. In 2011, Sandra Day O’Connor became the first female president of the club. In 2017, Michael Bloomberg was elected president of the club. In 2018, John Kerry was elected president. In 2019, Mitt Romney was elected. In 2020, David Rubenstein was elected.

== See also ==
- List of Alfalfa Club members
