= Joseph Firmage =

American investor

- Born: Joseph Firmage
- Occupations: Technology entrepreneur, investor
- Known for: Co-founder of USWeb; promotion of extraterrestrial and antigravity claims

Joseph Firmage is an American technology entrepreneur and investor who co-founded internet services company USWeb in 1995. He rose to prominence during the dot-com boom and was later known for promoting claims about extraterrestrials and antigravity propulsion technology.

== Career ==
=== Early ventures and USWeb ===
Firmage founded the software company Serius Corp. as a teenager. In 1993, Novell acquired Serius for approximately $24 million, making Firmage a vice president at the company.

In 1995, he co-founded the digital design company USWeb. USWeb went public in 1998 and was valued at approximately $2.5 billion during the dot-com boom. In 1998, Forbes named Firmage one of its "Masters of the New Universe".

In late 1998, Firmage publicly stated that he had experienced an encounter with an extraterrestrial being and began promoting beliefs about alien visitation and advanced propulsion physics. Amid concerns from investors during a merger between USWeb and CKS Group, he stepped down from his leadership role.

=== Later projects and legal issues ===
After leaving USWeb, Firmage funded and launched several ventures focused on science media and propulsion research, including projects developed with Ann Druyan. He later pursued efforts to develop antigravity propulsion technology, claiming that his work had attracted interest from U.S. government agencies.

Beginning in the 2010s and early 2020s, investors filed lawsuits alleging that Firmage had raised millions of dollars based on false representations about government contracts and technological breakthroughs. A federal civil suit filed in 2023 alleged that he and his associates were responsible for approximately $25 million in investor losses in a Ponzi scheme.

In 2023, Utah authorities charged Firmage with financially exploiting and abusing a vulnerable adult in connection with allegations that he took control of an elderly woman's finances and failed to pay her living expenses.

== Personal life ==
Firmage was raised in Salt Lake City in a Mormon family. He left the Church of Jesus Christ of Latter-day Saints as a teenager.
