= Raul Fernandez (entrepreneur) =

American businessman (born 1966)

Raul J. Fernandez
- Occupations: Entrepreneur; investor
- Title: Founder, Proxicom; Vice chairman, Monumental Sports & Entertainment

Raul J. Fernandez is an American businessman. He is the founder of the website and internet services developer Proxicom, and vice chairman of Monumental Sports & Entertainment.

== Career ==
Fernandez founded Proxicom, an internet development and consulting company, in 1991. Fernandez is the vice chairman of Monumental Sports & Entertainment, as well as a Special Advisor to General Atlantic Partners. Fernandez also is on the board for Broadcom, of DXC Technology, GameStop, and was previously a director from 2001 to 2017 and Chairman of the Compensation Committee for Kate Spade & Company before they were sold to Tapestry in July 2017. He is chairman of RemoteRetail, and ObjectVideo, a technology company sold to Alarm.com in 2017, and named a 2005 Technology Pioneer by the World Economic Forum.

== Proxicom ==
In 1991, Fernandez left his job at Digicon and founded Proxicom with $40,000. In late 2000, Proxicom gathered interest from two buyers: Compaq and Dimension Data. A bidding war ensued and Proxicom was bought by Dimension Data.

From 2000 to 2002, he was Chief Executive Officer for Dimension Data North America, and as a Director of its parent company, Dimension Data Holdings Plc, in 2001.

== Monumental Sports & Entertainment ==
Fernandez is the vice chairman and a limited partner of Monumental Sports & Entertainment, a sports and venue management company that owns the Washington Capitals of the NHL, the Washington Wizards of the NBA, and the Washington Mystics of the WNBA.

== Other ventures ==
Fernandez is a technology investor. He is the chairman of SaaS fashion company, RemoteRetail that is partnered with top brands such as Cosabella and ELOQUII. Fernandez is also an investor in Radius Networks, a provider of proximity technology for major retailers, restaurant chains, sports and entertainment complexes. He is an investor in the Professional Fighters League, a mixed martial arts league. In addition to traditional professional sports teams, Fernandez has invested in Cloud9, a North American eSports team out of Los Angeles.
