= GamersNexus =

Computer hardware news website

GamersNexus, LLC
- Trade name: GamersNexus
- Type: Private
- Industry: PC gaming reviews; Journalism; News media
- Founded: June 1, 2008; 18 years ago (Website); January 2, 2015; 11 years ago (Incorporated) in North Carolina, United States
- Founder: Steve Burke
- Headquarters: Cary, North Carolina, United States
- Key people: Steve Burke (editor-in-chief)

YouTube information
- Channel: Gamers Nexus
- Years active: 2009–present
- Genres: Technology reviews; computer hardware; documentaries
- Subscribers: 2.72 million
- Views: 872 million
- Last updated: October 9, 2026
- Website: gamersnexus.net

GamersNexus (GN) is a website and YouTube channel focusing on reviews and news about consumer computer hardware.

== Reporting ==
On May 18, 2025, GamersNexus published a video criticizing component manufacturer Nvidia of trading graphics cards for reviews. On August 17, 2025, GamersNexus published a 3.5-hour length documentary documenting an alleged black market for Nvidia GPUs used for artificial intelligence (AI). The documentary "may be the first long-form documentary on a new market created by US export restrictions", as VideoCardz writes. The documentary demonstrates how Nvidia RTX 5090 cards, which have not been officially released in China, still find their way into the Chinese market. The documentary also shows repair shops upgrading GPUs for customers. Practices like these were made illegal under US export law, but GamersNexus documents that they are completely legal under Chinese law.

This documentary was the subject of a copyright strike by media company Bloomberg. TweakTown writes that this strike was issued over a one minute and 15 second clip of US president Donald Trump speaking about US trade restrictions. GamersNexus alleged that the strike coincides with Bloomberg Originals' release of their own documentary, Why China is Building an AI Megaplex in the Desert, and further alleged that Bloomberg issued the strike because GamersNexus' documentary was pulling views away from Bloomberg's.

== Accolades ==
Award nominations for The Nvidia AI GPU Black Market documentary
Year	Award	Category	Result	Ref.
2026	Online Journalism Awards	Excellence in Technology Reporting, Small Newsroom	Finalist	

== Controversy ==
=== Controversy with Linus Media Group ===
On June 24, 2023, the YouTube channel Linus Tech Tips uploaded a video demonstrating a prototype dual water block from Billet Labs. In the video, channel namesake Linus Sebastian tested the block with a GeForce RTX 4090 graphics card, even though the unit had been specifically designed for the GeForce RTX 3090 Ti. Sondergard advised that they re-test the block using a 3090 Ti; however, Sebastian decided to publish the video of testing with the 4090, justifying this by saying that re-testing would not change the outcome of the video. Sebastian concluded that the dual design had no advantages and criticized the building experience, saying that consumers should not buy the product.

In response, GamersNexus posted a video in which GN editor-in-chief Steve Burke stated that Linus Tech Tips had sold the prototype during a silent charity auction without the consent of Billet Labs (who had sent the prototype to LMG not expecting a return). More broadly, GamersNexus accused Linus Tech Tips of "rushing content out the door" and tarnishing its "accuracy, ethics, and responsibility". GN cited a number of videos in which Linus Tech Tips had made mistakes which in the eyes of GamersNexus were corrected in an insufficient manner, or not at all.

Linus Sebastian made a written response to GamersNexus, saying that the company had experienced "growing pains" and would strive to increase the quality of their work in the future, but he defended not retesting the prototype with the proper graphics card as he saw that it would not improve the results and called the product an "egregious waste of money." Burke criticized this response as "unhinged" and "unapologetic". Linus Media Group later agreed to compensate Billet Labs for the cost of the prototype.

A video featuring Sebastian, CEO Terren Tong, and CFO Yvonne Ho was later published to the Linus Tech Tips channel on August 16, 2023, apologizing for the handling of the prototype water block along with their response to the situation. In the video, Linus Media Group also announced a week-long video production pause, which reportedly lasted ten days, while changes were made at the company. The apology video was criticized for being monetized as well as featuring jokes about sponsorships and links to the channel's store page. The video was demonetized by Linus Media Group following the criticism. The store page was also linked in the video's description, but Dexerto noted that this could have been automated by YouTube and not purposefully placed. In response to a comment on Floatplane, Linus Media Group's video sharing platform, suggesting the jokes be removed, Sebastian responded through the Linus Tech Tips account, saying that "We won't be able to make everyone perfectly happy, so what we're going to do is be ourselves—the best version of ourselves—and move past this", and asked "Is a little humor a bad thing...? Honest question".

=== NZXT Flex controversy ===
On November 30, 2024, GamersNexus published a video alleging that the NZXT Flex program was predatory and a scam, and publicly announced that it would no longer accept sponsorships from the company. NZXT later published an apology video in December 2024, but this video was criticized as a "standard non-apology" by PC World. NZXT later paid a US$3.45 million settlement over the program.

=== Paypal Honey controversy ===
In January 2025, GamersNexus sued PayPal over alleged consumer protection violations through PayPal Honey.

== See also ==
- Newegg § 2022 Gamers Nexus RMA and open-box controversy
