= IQ Business Group =

Coordinates: 38°55′57″N 77°14′8″W

IQBG - The IQ Business Group, Inc
- Type: Private
- Industry: Software
- Headquarters: McLean, Virginia, U.S.
- Area served: Worldwide
- Key people: Eric Wadsworth (Chairman &CEO)
- Number of employees: 100 (2012)
- Website: iqbginc.com

The iQ Business Group (IQBG) is an American multinational corporation that provides record management software systems. It is headquartered in McLean, Virginia.

The company provides enterprise information management (EIM) to highly-regulated industries and the public sector. The company also specializes in enterprise content management (ECM), records management (RM), business process and customer experience management, information exchange, and discovery systems.

== History ==
The company was Founded in 1998 in Virginia.

In June 2012, IQBG was awarded a $53 million Software as a Service (Saas) contract from the United States Department of the Interior (DOI) to provide an information governance system. Known as the eMail, Enterprise Records, and Document Management System (eERDMS), the solution developed by the Department and supported by IQBG captures and auto-classifies (stores in folders according to subject) 75 million e-mails per month and drives compliance towards Presidential Directive M-12-18, signed by President Barack Obama in 2011, requiring that “Federal agencies will manage both permanent and temporary email records in an accessible electronic format” by 2016.
