= Fred Chang =

Taiwanese-born American entrepreneur

- 張法俊
- Born: 1957 (age 68–69); Taiwan
- Education: Chinese Cultural University (BA)
- Known for: Founder of Newegg

Fred Chang (Chinese: 張法俊; born 1957) is a Taiwanese-born American entrepreneur. He is the founder of Newegg, an online computer hardware and software store. He debuted on the Forbes 400 list in 2013 and its World's Billionaires ranking in 2014; Chang held the position of #1940 in the billionaire 2017 ranking.

== Education ==
Chang has a degree from the Chinese Cultural University.

== Career ==
Before founding Newegg, Chang owned ABS Computers, a mail order company selling high-end PCs and gaming systems, based in Whittier, California. Building on this experience, he founded Newegg in 2001. It has grown into a multibillion-dollar company, becoming the second-largest online-only retailer in the United States.

In August 2008, it was announced that Chang would step down as the CEO and chairman of Newegg while still being a member of Board of Directors and Executive Committee. He also retained his position as the President of Newegg's China operations. He was succeeded by Tally Liu. In 2010, upon the departure of Liu, Chang took up his old role as CEO of the company until 2019.

In 2013, Chang was included on the Forbes 400 list of America's 400 richest individuals.

Chang owns an estimated 50% or more of Newegg.
