= Scient =

- Type: Internet consulting
- Industry: IT
- Founded: 1997
- Founder: Eric Greenberg
- Defunct: 2002
- Fate: Bought by SBI and Company
- Headquarters: San Francisco, United States
- Number of employees: 1,180

Scient was a large San Francisco-based Internet consulting company founded in 1997, that was successful during the dot-com bubble. The company was founded by Eric Greenberg, who had previously founded its competitor, Viant. Its CEO was Robert Howe, the former head of IBM global consulting. At the time of the IPO in May 1999, the management team was still headed by Eric Greenberg, Chairman and Founder, and Robert M. Howe, President & Chief Executive Officer.

At the height of its success, in the fall of 2000, Scient had quarterly revenues of US$100 million, with a stock price of $133, and a total of roughly 1,180 employees.

In August 2001, Scient bought rival company iXL; by then its quarterly revenues were down to US$11 million.

In July 2002, the company filed for bankruptcy and was bought by SBI and Company, which became SBI Group. SBI Group later sold Scient with the other members of Avenue A/Razorfish to a company called aQuantive.

aQuantive was acquired by Microsoft in August 2007, to serve as Microsoft's newly created Advertiser and Publisher Solutions (APS) Group. On August 9, 2009, Microsoft sold the firm to Publicis Groupe for $530M in cash and stock.
