= Divine, Inc. =

- Founded: 1999; 27 years ago
- Founder: Andrew Filipowski
- Defunct: April 2003; 23 years ago
- Fate: Bankruptcy and liquidation
- Headquarters: Chicago
- Revenue: ▲$199 million (2001)
- Net income: ▲ -$369 million (2001)
- Total assets: ▲$874 million (2001)
- Total equity: ▼$251 million (2001)
- Number of employees: 3,600 (2001)

Divine, Inc. (stylized in lowercase), originally Divine Interventures, was a company that invested in internet companies during the dot-com bubble. The company was originally modeled after CMGI but changed its business plan after the bubble burst.

The company's tagline was "an Internet Zaibatsu" and the company's goal was to create "a family of businesses that work collaboratively to create mutual opportunity and gain."

In 2003, it filed bankruptcy and underwent liquidation after executives were accused of looting a subsidiary.

== History ==
The company was founded by Andrew Filipowski in 1999.

The company had 38 people on the board of directors, including Michael Jordan, and on February 3, 2001, 27 members resigned as the company attempted to streamline its management.

In July 2000, as the dot-com bubble burst, the company became a public company via an initial public offering.

In February 2001, the company changed its name from Divine Interventures to Divine.

In April 2001, the company acquired most of the assets of MarchFirst for $120 million.

In May 2001, the company agreed to acquire RoweCom for $14 million in stock.

In July 2001, the company agreed to acquire eShare for $71 million in stock.

In August 2001, the company agreed to acquire Open Market for $59 million in stock.

In January 2003, creditors of RoweCom filed a lawsuit against Divine, claiming that executives fraudulently transferred $73.7 million that was due to publishers, before abandoning the business.

On February 25, 2003, the company filed bankruptcy.

In April 2003, Divine's assets were sold at auction to Saratoga Partners, Golden Gate Private Equity, Little Bear Investment, and Outtask, for a total of $54 million. Saratoga Partners then sold the enterprise content management business to FatWire. The Open Market patents were acquired by Soverain Software.
