= USWeb =

American design agency (1995–1999)

- Founded: 1995; 31 years ago
- Founders: Joe Firmage; Toby Corey; Sheldon Laube
- Defunct: 1999
- Fate: Acquired by Whittman-Hart

USWeb was an interactive design agency founded in 1995 by former Novell executives Joe Firmage, Toby Corey, Ken Campbell, Jim Heffernan and Sheldon Laube during the dot com bubble. USWeb made its first public offering on the NASDAQ exchange in late 1997. In September 1998, the company announced that it would merge with CKS; it became USWeb/CKS. In late 1999 the company announced that it was being acquired by Whittmann-Hart, a Chicago-based internet consultancy.

On March 1, 2000, the combined company was renamed marchFIRST, Inc. It went bankrupt in 2001.

== Business model ==
USWeb's business model focused on acquisitions of small, independent web design firms and their client bases, with the company's public stock as payment; in all, it bought more than three dozen other companies. Critics, including competitors and analysts, expressed skepticism citing doubts that USWeb would find a niche market in an industry that put a high premium on innovation, and questioned its ability to sustain client retention and growth with its brand and services.

As the company grew, it offered business strategy consulting, brand marketing, website design, backend engineering, usability, and one of the first SEO marketing practices.

== History ==
In late 1998, as the merger of USWeb and CKS was being finalized, one of the founders and CEO of USWeb, Joseph P. Firmage, was asked to step down as CEO after he claimed to have been visited by extraterrestrials in his bedroom. Firmage publicly claimed that extraterrestrials had revealed advanced technologies to him and knowledge of alien civilizations.

In early 1999, after Firmage had moved to a consulting role at USWeb/CKS, Robert Shaw assumed the role of CEO of the company. In December 1999, the company announced it was being acquired by Whittmann-Hart, a Chicago-based internet consultancy, followed by a name change, to marchFIRST, Inc., in early 2000; Shaw became the company's Chairman while Robert Bernard, the CEO of Whittman-Hart, continued in that position in the now larger company.

marchFIRST, Inc. went bankrupt in April 2001; in May 2001 it was dissolved.
