= Whittman-Hart =

Services company dealing with digital communications

Whittman-Hart Inc.
- Traded as: Nasdaq: MRCH
- Industry: Web development
- Founded: March 1, 2000; 26 years ago
- Defunct: May 2001; 25 years ago
- Fate: Bankruptcy
- Headquarters: Chicago
- Key people: Bob Bernard, CEO

Whittman-Hart was a services company dealing with digital communications. Founded in 1984, it grew steadily until 1999, when it acquired US Web/CKS, more than doubling its size. The combined company was re-corporated on March 1, 2000, with the new name of marchFIRST, inc. In May 2001, marchFIRST, which had declared bankruptcy a month earlier, was liquidated.

== Early history ==
Founded in 1984 by Bob Bernard, Bill Merchantz, Rich Colson, and Bill Topol in the Chicago area, the company initially specialized in IBM AS/400 IT consulting. In 1990 the company split, with Merchantz leaving with the software side of the company, and Bernard in charge of the consulting business, which then had revenues of $9 million a year.

The company grew steadily, for about 15 years, including some acquisitions, and went public in 1996. In 1997, Fortune magazine named it one of the fastest-growing companies in the US.

For the nine months ended September 30, 1999, the company reported net income of $21.3 million, or 35 cents a share, on revenue of $342.7 million.

In November 1999 the company acquired Fulcrum Solutions Ltd, a UK-based Oracle technology specialist. At that time, Whittman-Hart had approximately 3,900 employees in 22 branch offices throughout the United States and the United Kingdom.

== Merger with USWeb/CKS ==
In December 1999, the company announced that it would acquire USWeb/CKS, a California-based web consulting firm, for $5.7 billion in company stock. Although announced as an acquisition, USWeb shareholders would own 57% of the merged company after exchanging their shares for shares of Whittman-Hart, making the deal somewhat close to a merger.

The new company, which changed its name to MarchFIRST Inc., on March 1, 2000, had 9,000 employees around the world, including about 1,500 in the Chicago area; about 8,000 were in the U.S. It was the world's largest Internet services company, with annual sales of about $500 million. Robert Shaw, the CEO at USWeb/CKS, became the company's chairman while Bernard continued as CEO in the now larger company. marchFIRST was traded on the Nasdaq; its peak stock price was around $52.

As the dot-com boom ended, MarchFIRST's fortunes began dropping quickly along with the high-tech Internet sector. In October 2000, its stock dropped nearly 60 percent after reporting a third-quarter loss of $437 million, compared with a profit of $9 million, a year earlier, and that sales were $369 million, 20 percent less than the prior quarter.

In November 2000, Bernard announced that the company would focus on more traditional companies, helping with building e-commerce operations, and would drop more than 1,000 clients, concentrating on 500 of its best customers .

In December 2000, Francisco Partners LP, a private equity firm, agreed to invest $150 million in the company in exchange for preferred stock, which, when converted, would equal a 32 percent share of the company.

On February 13, 2001, the company missed earnings expectations again and its stock price fell another 35%. On March 13, 2001, Bernard, the chairman and chief executive, resigned, along with Chief Operating Officer Thomas Metz and Joseph Bong, executive vice president of client services. At that point, the company had laid off 1,500 employees in the prior four months.

By March 28, the company stock was trading for $0.16 per share. On April 2, the company announced 1,700 layoffs.

On April 13, 2001, the company filed for Chapter 11 bankruptcy protection. On May 1, 2001, the company filed for a liquidation under Chapter 7, Title 11, United States Code.

The company sold most of its assets to Divine for $120 million; that company went bankrupt in 2003. Former management, including Bernard, also acquired some assets of the company. SBI, a professional services company based in Salt Lake City, acquired additional assets of the company in June 2001. marchFIRST Norway was acquired by Itera ASA in July 2001.

== Post-bankruptcy ==
While the company's assets were liquidated in the middle of 2001, its remaining corporate shell remained mired in bankruptcy proceedings for the next two years.

In mid-2003, Bernard launched a slimmed-down Internet technology consulting company. The new firm, operating in five Midwestern cities including Chicago, reincarnated the well-known WhittmanHart name (minus the hyphen).

In 2005–2006 WhittmanHart acquired numerous organizations, including Ohio-based Infinis Inc, Philadelphia-based Insight Interactive Group Inc, Maryland-based Estco.net, LLC, Chicago-based Vision Enterprises, and Los Angeles-based DNA Studio. Bernard died in February 2007.

On July 29, 2008, Rolta acquired the consulting division of WhittmanHart Inc. On September 28, 2010, WhittmanHart, Inc. was rebranded as Band Digital, Inc.
