= MacBook Pro (Intel-based) =

Line of notebook computers

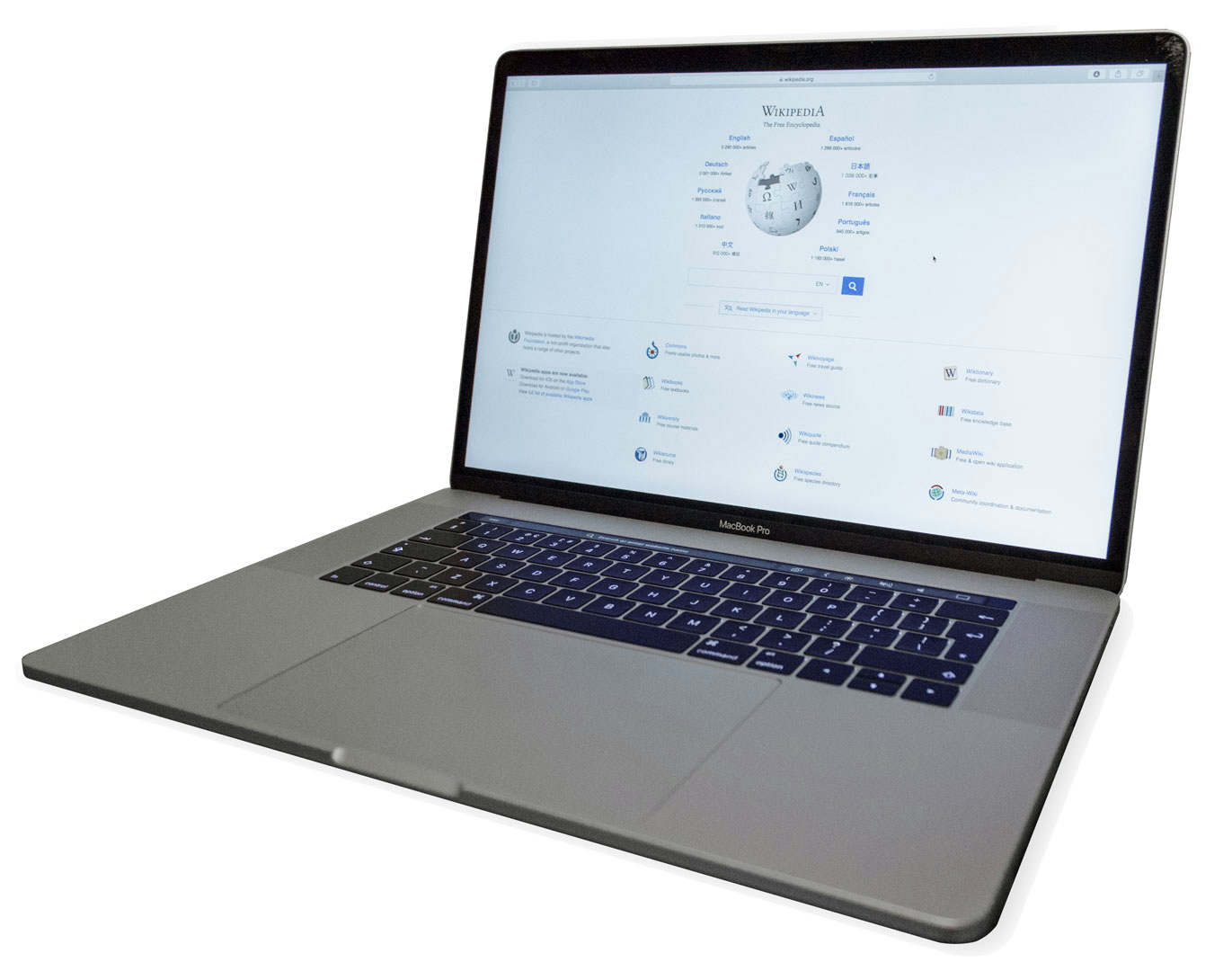
- MacBook Pro (15-inch, 2016)
- Developer: Apple
- Manufacturer: Foxconn; Pegatron
- Product family: MacBook
- Type: Notebook
- Released: February 14, 2006 (Aluminum); October 18, 2008 (Unibody); June 11, 2012 (Retina); October 27, 2016 (Touch Bar)
- Discontinued: November 10, 2020 (13-inch (330 mm) with two ports); October 18, 2021 (13-inch (330 mm) with four ports, 16-inch (410 mm))
- Operating system: macOS
- CPU: Intel Core Duo, 2 Duo, i5, i7, i9
- Predecessor: PowerBook G4
- Successor: MacBook Pro (Apple silicon)
- Related: MacBook; MacBook Air; iMac
- Website: apple.com/macbook-pro

The Intel-based MacBook Pro is a discontinued line of notebook computers in the Mac series sold by Apple from 2006 to 2021. It was the higher-end model of the MacBook family, sitting above the low-end plastic MacBook and the ultra-portable MacBook Air, and was sold with 13-inch (330 mm) to 17-inch (430 mm) screens.

The MacBook Pro line launched in 2006 as an Intel-based replacement for the PowerBook line. The first MacBook Pro used an aluminum chassis similar to the PowerBook G4, but replaced the PowerPC G4 chips with Intel Core processors, added a webcam, and introduced the MagSafe power connector. The unibody model debuted in October 2008, so-called because its case was machined from a single piece of aluminum. It had a thinner, flush display, a redesigned trackpad whose entire surface consisted of a single clickable button, and a redesigned keyboard.

The Retina MacBook Pro was released in 2012: it is thinner, made solid-state drive (SSD) standard, added HDMI, and included a high-resolution Retina display. It eliminated Ethernet and FireWire ports and the optical drive. The Touch Bar MacBook Pro – so-called because of its Touch Bar strip with a Touch ID sensor – released in October 2016, adopted USB-C for all data ports and power and included a shallower "butterfly"-mechanism keyboard. A November 2019 revision to the Touch Bar MacBook Pro introduced the Magic Keyboard, which used a scissor-switch mechanism.

The Intel-based MacBook Pros were succeeded by Apple silicon MacBook Pros beginning in 2020 as part of the Mac transition to Apple silicon. On November 10, 2020, Apple discontinued the two-port 13-inch (330 mm) model following the release of a new model based on the Apple M1. The 16-inch (410 mm) and four-port 13-inch (330 mm) models were discontinued on October 18, 2021, following the release of 14-inch (360 mm) and 16-inch (410 mm) models based on the M1 Pro and M1 Max.

== Aluminum (2006–2008) ==
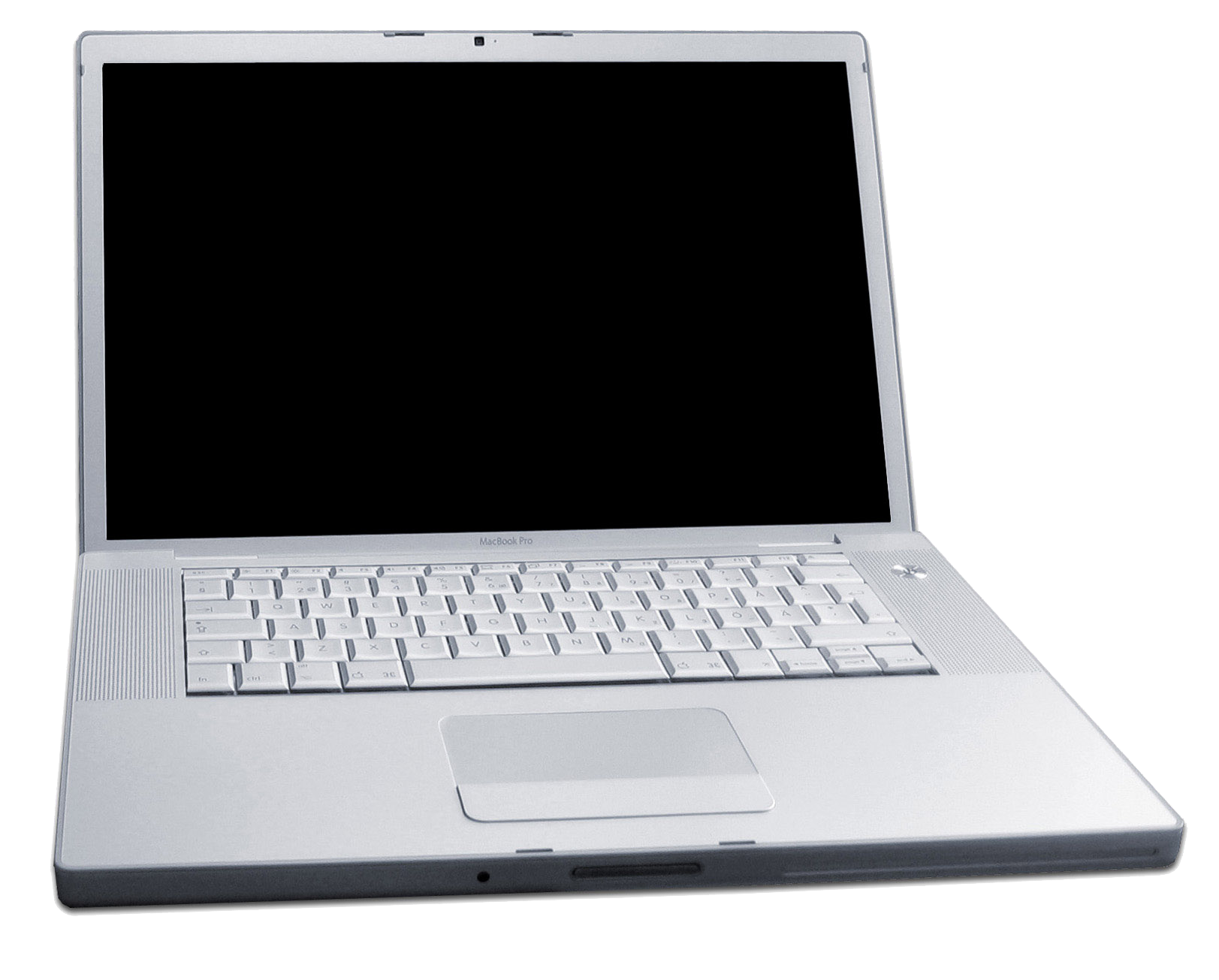
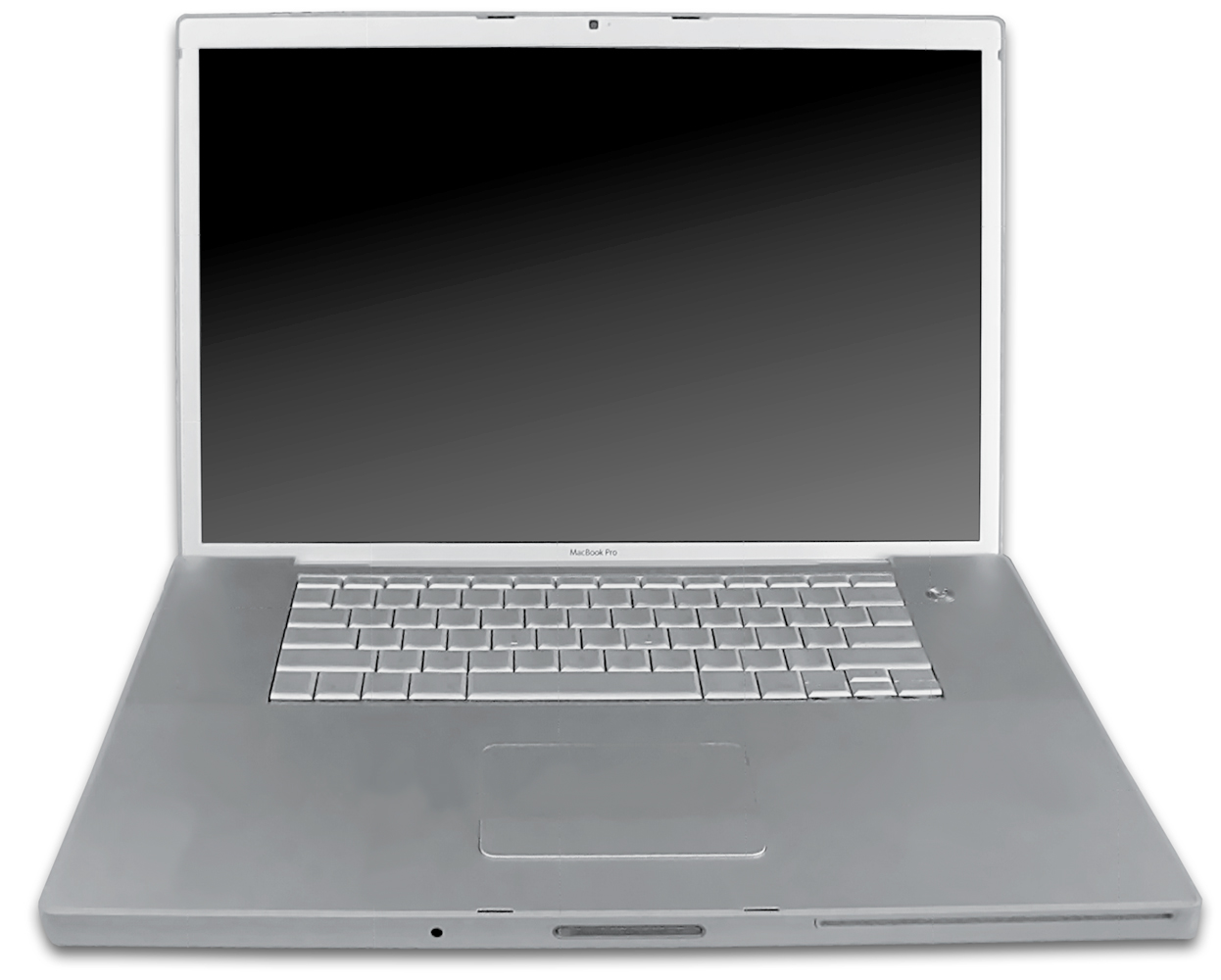
The 15-inch (380 mm) and 17-inch (430 mm) Aluminum MacBook Pros

The original 15-inch (380 mm) MacBook Pro was announced on January 10, 2006, by Steve Jobs at the Macworld Conference & Expo. The 17-inch (430 mm) model was unveiled on April 24, 2006. The first design was largely a carryover from the PowerBook G4, but uses Intel Core CPUs instead of PowerPC G4 chips. The 15-inch (380 mm) MacBook Pro weighs the same as the 15-inch (380 mm) aluminum PowerBook G4, but is 0.1 inches (2.5 mm) deeper, 0.4 inches (10 mm) wider, and 0.1 inches (2.5 mm) thinner. Other changes from the PowerBook include a built-in iSight webcam and the inclusion of MagSafe, a magnetic power connector designed to detach easily when yanked. These features were later brought over to the MacBook. The optical drive was shrunk to fit into the slimmer MacBook Pro; it runs slower than the optical drive in the PowerBook G4 and cannot write to dual-layer DVDs.

Both the original 15-inch (380 mm) and 17-inch (430 mm) model MacBook Pro computers come with ExpressCard/34 slots, which replace the PC Card slots found in the PowerBook G4. Initial aluminum 15-inch (380 mm) models retains the two USB 2.0 ports and a FireWire 400 port but drops the FireWire 800, until it was restored in a later revision, the 17-inch (430 mm) models have an additional USB 2.0 port, as well as the FireWire 800 port missing from the initial 15-inch (380 mm) models. All models now included 802.11a/b/g. Later models include support for the draft 2.0 specification of 802.11n and Bluetooth 2.1.

=== Updates ===
Apple refreshed the entire MacBook Pro line on October 24, 2006, to include Intel Core 2 Duo processors which were the first 64-Bit processors in the MacBook Pro. Memory capacity was doubled for each model, up to 2 GB for the high-end 15-inch (380 mm) and 17-inch (430 mm) models. FireWire 800 was added to the 15-inch (380 mm) models and hard drive capacity was increased.

The MacBook Pro line received a second update on June 5, 2007, with new Nvidia GeForce 8600M GT graphics processors and faster CPU options. LED backlighting was added to the 15-inch (380 mm) model's screen, and its weight was reduced from 5.6 pounds (2.5 kg) to 5.4 pounds (2.4 kg). Furthermore, the speed of the front-side bus was increased from 667 to 800 MHz. The EFI also was 64-bit for the first time as well.

On November 1, 2007, Apple added the option of a 2.6 GHz Santa Rosa platform Core 2 Duo CPU as well as reconfigured hard drive options. The keyboard also received several changes to closely mirror the one which shipped with the iMac, by adding the same keyboard shortcuts to control multimedia, and removing the embedded numeric keypad and the Apple logo from the command keys.

On February 26, 2008, the MacBook Pro line was updated once more. LED backlighting was added as an option for the 17-inch (430 mm) model. Processors were updated to "Penryn" cores, which are built on the 45 nm process (65 nm "Merom" cores were previously used), and hard drive and memory capacities were increased. Multi-touch capabilities, first introduced with the MacBook Air earlier that year, were brought over to the trackpad.

The original case design was discontinued on October 14, 2008, for the 15-inch (380 mm), and January 6, 2009, for the 17-inch (430 mm).

=== Reception ===
Some reviewers applauded the original MacBook Pro for its doubling or tripling the speed of the PowerBook G4 in some areas. For example, the 3D rendering program Cinema 4D XL was 3.3 times as fast (2.3 times faster), and its boot-up time was more than twice as quick. The MacBook Pro generally outperformed the PowerBook G4 in performance analyzer utility tests XBench and Cinebench. Reviewers lauded the screen's maximum brightness, 67% brighter than the PowerBook G4; the excellent horizontal viewing angles; the matte options; and the bright, crisp, and true colors. Although the screen offered fewer vertical pixels (1440 × 900 in the MacBook Pro instead of 1440 × 960 in the PowerBook), one reviewer called the screen "nothing less than stellar". Reviewers praised the new MagSafe power adapter, although one reviewer said it disconnected too easily in some instances. They also praised the backlit keyboard, large trackpad, and virtually silent operation of the machine. The new notebook also offered better wireless performance.

One reviewer criticized the decision to underclock the ATI Mobility Radeon X1600 graphics card by about 30% its original speed. The notebook was also noted for running hot. Users complained that upgrading system memory was harder than in older Apple notebooks. Since the dimensions for the 15-inch (380 mm) MacBook Pro were tweaked slightly from the 15-inch (380 mm) PowerBook G4, older accessories such as notebook sleeves did not work with the new models. Some users noted a slight flickering when the screen was on lower brightness settings. Apple increased the battery capacity by 10 Wh, going from 50 in the PowerBook G4 to 60, but the more powerful Core Duo CPU required more power. Battery life therefore remained about the same as in previous models, at three-plus hours.

=== 2007–2008 model GPU problems ===
Models of the MacBook Pro built from 2007 to approximately October of 2008 (mid 2007 to early 2008 15-inch (380 mm) and 17-inch (430 mm) models) using the Nvidia 8600M GT chip reportedly exhibited failures in which the GPU die would detach from the chip carrier, the chip would detach from the logic board. The issue has been mitigated by some users by keeping the notebook cooler by means of less intensive use or alternative fan settings. Apple initially ignored reports, before admitting to the fault and replacing logic boards free of charge for up to 4 years after the purchase date. NVIDIA also confirmed the issue, and previously manufactured replacement GPUs, which some users have replaced themselves.

=== Technical specifications ===
According to Apple, all of these models are obsolete. (Note: Apple products that have been discontinued for seven years and no longer receive hardware support or spare parts)

Model		Original and "Glossy" (retroactively known as Early 2006)					Core 2 Duo (retroactively known as Late 2006)			2.4/2.2GHz (retroactively known as Mid 2007 and Late 2007)			Early 2008 and Late 2008			
Component / processor model		Yonah Intel Core					Merom Intel Core			Merom (Santa Rosa) Intel Core			Penryn Intel Core			
Released		Never shipped	February 14, 2006 (Note: A less-expensive model shipped May 16, 2006.)			April 24, 2006	October 24, 2006			June 5, 2007			February 26, 2008			October 14, 2008
Discontinued		Never shipped	October 24, 2006				June 5, 2007			February 26, 2008			October 14, 2008			January 6, 2009
Unsupported		February 25, 2014					October 2014			October 2018						
MSRP (USD)		$1999	$1999 (Note: Order number MA463 was initially introduced as MA091 at a higher price of $2500 with a 100 GB HD and more video RAM, but that model never shipped.)	$2500	$2799	$2799	$1999	$2499	$2799	$1999	$2499	$2799	$1999	$2499	$2799	
Model	Common name and Model number	Early 2006 15-inch A1150				Early 2006 17-inch A1151	Late 2006 15-inch A1211		Late 2006 17-inch A1212	Mid 2007 and Late 2007 15-inch A1226		Mid 2007 and Late 2007 17-inch A1229	Early 2008 15-inch A1260		Early 2008 17-inch A1261	Late 2008 17-inch A1261
Model	Model identifier	MacBookPro1,1				MacBookPro1,2	MacBookPro2,2		MacBookPro2,1	MacBookPro3,1			MacBookPro4,1			
Model	Apple order number	MA090; Never shipped	MA463	MA464; After May 16, 2006: MA600	MA601	MA092	MA609	MA610	MA611	MA895	MA896	MA897	MB133	MB134	MB166	MB766
Display (matte or glossy) (Note: Through use of a second display, all pre-unibody MacBook Pros simultaneously support their native resolution on the internal display and a maximum 2560 × 1600 on an external display.)		15.4" LCD 1440 × 900				17" LCD 1680 × 1050	15.4" LCD 1440 × 900		17" LCD 1680 × 1050	15.4" LCD 1440 × 900 with LED backlighting		17" LCD 1680 × 1050 with CCFL backlighting Optional 1920 × 1200 with CCFL backlighting	15.4" LCD 1440 × 900 with LED backlighting		17" LCD 1680 × 1050 with CCFL backlighting Optional 1920 × 1200 with LED backlighting	17" LCD 1920 × 1200 with LED backlighting
Processor	Standard	1.67 GHz (L2400); Intel Core Duo Yonah	1.83 GHz (T2400); Intel Core Duo Yonah	2.0 GHz (T2500); Intel Core Duo Yonah	2.16 GHz (T2600); Intel Core Duo Yonah		2.16 GHz (T7400); Intel Core 2 Duo Merom	2.33 GHz (T7600); Intel Core 2 Duo Merom		2.2 GHz (T7500); Intel Core 2 Duo Merom	2.4 GHz (T7700); Intel Core 2 Duo Merom		2.4 GHz (T8300); Intel Core 2 Duo Penryn	2.5 GHz (T9300); Intel Core 2 Duo Penryn		
Processor	On-chip L2 cache	2 MB					4 MB						3 MB	6 MB		
Processor	Optional	—N/a									Starting November 1, 2007: 2.6 GHz (T7800); Intel Core 2 Duo Merom		2.6 GHz (T9500); Intel Core 2 Duo Penryn; 6 MB on-chip L2 cache			
Front-side bus		667 MHz								800 MHz						
Memory	Standard	512 MB (two 256 MB)		1 GB (two 512 MB); After May 16, 2006: 512 MB (two 256 MB)	1 GB (two 512 MB)			2 GB (two 1 GB)								4 GB (two 2 GB)
Memory	Optional	Expandable to 2 GB (Note: Existing memory modules may need to be replaced.)					Expandable to 4 GB, but only 3 GB addressable			Expandable to 6 GB (Note: Some sources reference 6 GB functionality.)						
Memory	Format	Two slots for PC2-5300 DDR2 SDRAM (667 MHz)														
Graphics with dual-link DVI	Card	ATI Mobility Radeon X1600								Nvidia Geforce 8600M GT				Nvidia Geforce 8600M GT		
Graphics with dual-link DVI	VRAM	128 or 256 MB		256 MB			128 or 256 MB						256 MB	512 MB		
Graphics with dual-link DVI	VRAM type	GDDR3 SDRAM														
Hard drive (Note: Hard and solid-state drives listed are configurations available from Apple.)	Standard (5,400 rpm)	80 GB		100 GB After May 16, 2006: 80 GB)	100 GB	120 GB			160 GB	120 GB	160 GB		200 or 250 GB		250 or 320 GB	320 GB
Hard drive	Optional	100 GB 7,200 rpm, 120 GB 5,400 rpm					160 GB, 5,400 rpm, 200 GB 4,200 rpm		100 GB, 7,200 rpm, 200 GB 4,200 rpm	160 GB 5400 rpm, 160 GB 7200 rpm, 200 GB 4200 rpm	120 GB 5400 rpm, 160 GB 7200 rpm, 200 GB 4200 rpm		200 GB 7,200 rpm, 300 GB 4,200 rpm			320 GB, 7,200 rpm, 128 GB SSD
Hard drive	Format	SATA I (1.5 Gbit/s)														
Optical disc drive (Note: Quoted optical drive speeds are the maximum possible for each drive.)		4x Slot-loading SuperDrive (DVD±RW/CD-RW)				8x Slot-loading SuperDrive (DVD±R DL/DVD±RW/CD-RW)										
Connectivity		Integrated Wi-Fi 3 (802.11a/b/g) (Qualcomm Atheros AR5007 chipset)					Integrated Wi-Fi 4 (802.11a/b/g and draft-n, n disabled by default) (Note: Wireless-N functionality requires installing the wireless-N enabler software included with the AirPort Extreme Wireless-N Router or sold as a download on the Apple online store, or by upgrading to OS X 10.5 "Leopard" or later.) (Qualcomm Atheros AR5008 chipset)			Integrated Wi-Fi 4 (802.11a/b/g and draft-n) (Qualcomm Atheros AR5008 or Broadcom BCM4322 chipset, depending on revision)						
Connectivity		Bluetooth 2.0 + EDR											Bluetooth 2.1 + EDR			
Connectivity		Gigabit Ethernet														
Peripheral connections		2x USB 2.0				3x USB 2.0	2x USB 2.0		3x USB 2.0	2x USB 2.0		3x USB 2.0	2x USB 2.0		3x USB 2.0	
Peripheral connections		1x FireWire 400				1x FireWire 400 and 1x FireWire 800										
Peripheral connections		ExpressCard/34, DVI, audio line in/out														
Operating system	Minimum	Mac OS X 10.4 Tiger											Mac OS X 10.5 Leopard			
Operating system	Latest release	Mac OS X 10.6 Snow Leopard					Mac OS X 10.7 Lion if 2 GB RAM installed, otherwise Mac OS X 10.6 Snow Leopard			OS X 10.11 El Capitan						
Battery (lithium-polymer, removable)		60 Wh				68 Wh	60 Wh		68 Wh	60 Wh		68 Wh	60 Wh		68 Wh	
Weight		5.6 lb (2.5 kg)				6.8 lb (3.1 kg)	5.6 lb (2.5 kg)		6.8 lb (3.1 kg)	5.4 lb (2.4 kg)		6.8 lb (3.1 kg)	5.4 lb (2.4 kg)		6.8 lb (3.1 kg)	
Dimensions (width × depth × thickness)		14.1 in (36 cm) × 9.6 in (24 cm) × 1.0 in (2.5 cm)				15.4 in (39 cm) × 10.4 in (26 cm) × 1.0 in (2.5 cm)	14.1 in (36 cm) × 9.6 in (24 cm) × 1.0 in (2.5 cm)		15.4 in (39 cm) × 10.4 in (26 cm) × 1.0 in (2.5 cm)	14.1 in (36 cm) × 9.6 in (24 cm) × 1.0 in (2.5 cm)		15.4 in (39 cm) × 10.4 in (26 cm) × 1.0 in (2.5 cm)	14.1 in (36 cm) × 9.6 in (24 cm) × 1.0 in (2.5 cm)		15.4 in (39 cm) × 10.4 in (26 cm) × 1.0 in (2.5 cm)	

== Unibody (2008–2012) ==
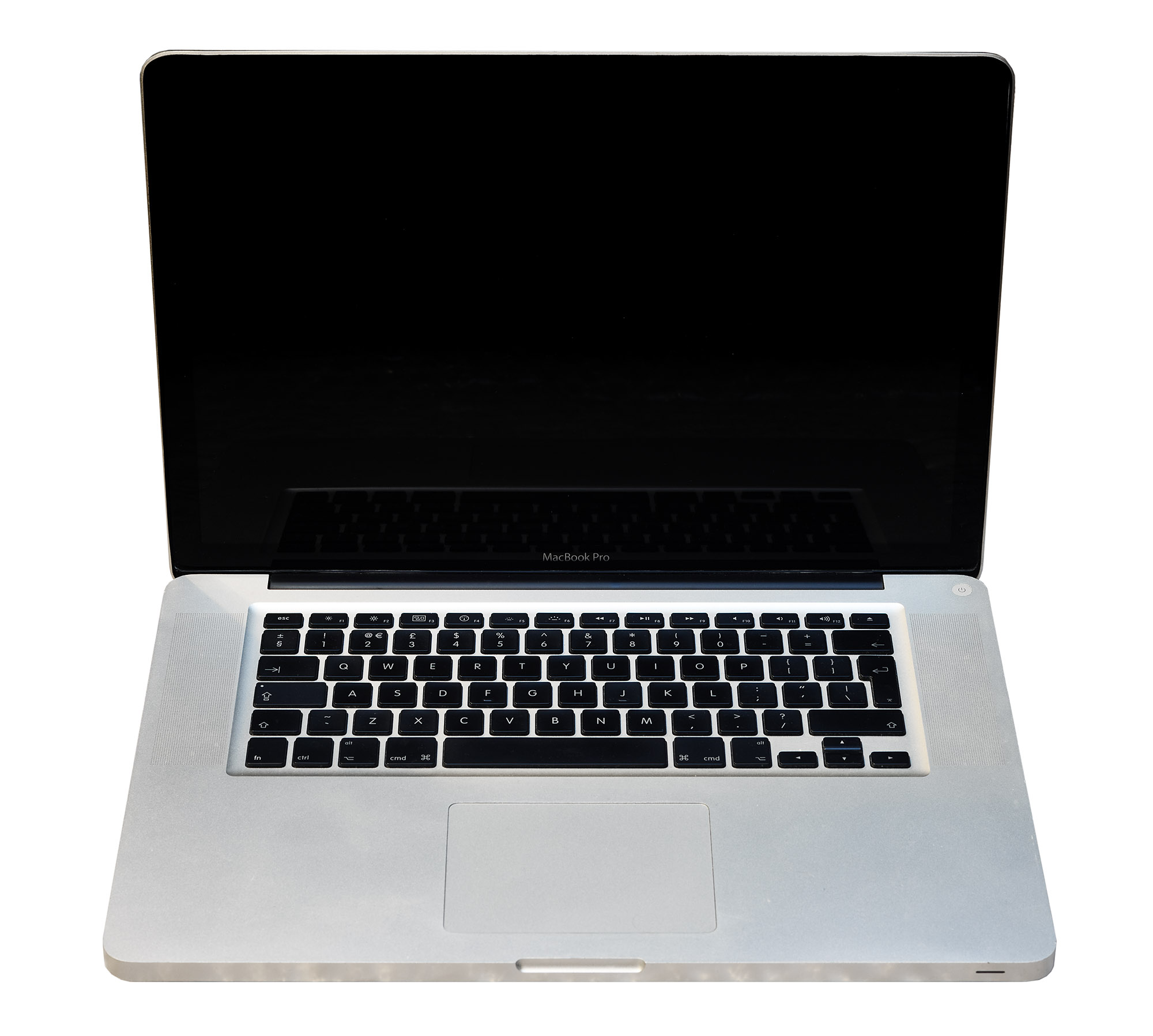
MacBook Pro Unibody 15 inch

On October 14, 2008, in a press event at company headquarters, Apple officials announced a new 15-inch MacBook Pro featuring a "precision aluminum unibody enclosure" and tapered sides similar to those of the MacBook Air. Designers shifted all of the MacBook Pro's ports to the left side of the case, and moved the optical disc drive slot from the front to the right side, similar to the MacBook. The new MacBook Pro computers had two video cards that the user could switch between: the Nvidia GeForce 9600M GT with either 256 or 512 MB of dedicated memory and a GeForce 9400M with 256 MB of shared system memory. Although the FireWire 400 port was removed, the FireWire 800 port remained. The DVI port was replaced with a Mini DisplayPort receptacle. The original unibody MacBook Pro came with a user-removable battery; Apple claimed five hours of use, with one reviewer reporting results closer to four hours on a continuous video battery stress test. Apple said that the battery would hold 80% of its charge after 300 recharges.

=== Design ===
The slick unibody-construction MacBook Pro largely follows the styling of the original aluminum iMac and the MacBook Air. The unibody Macbook Pro body is milled from a single block of aluminum and is much stronger than its predecessor. The screen is high-gloss, covered by an edge-to-edge reflective glass finish, while an anti-glare matte option is available in the 15- and 17-inch models in which the glass panel is removed. The entire trackpad is usable and acts as a clickable button. The trackpad is also larger than that of the aluminum models, giving more room for scrolling and multi-touch gestures. When the line was updated in April 2010, inertial scrolling was added, making the scrolling experience much like that of the iPhone and iPad. The keys, which are still backlit, are now identical to those of Apple's now-standard sunken keyboard with separated black keys. The physical screen release latch from the aluminum models is replaced with a magnetic one.

=== Updates ===
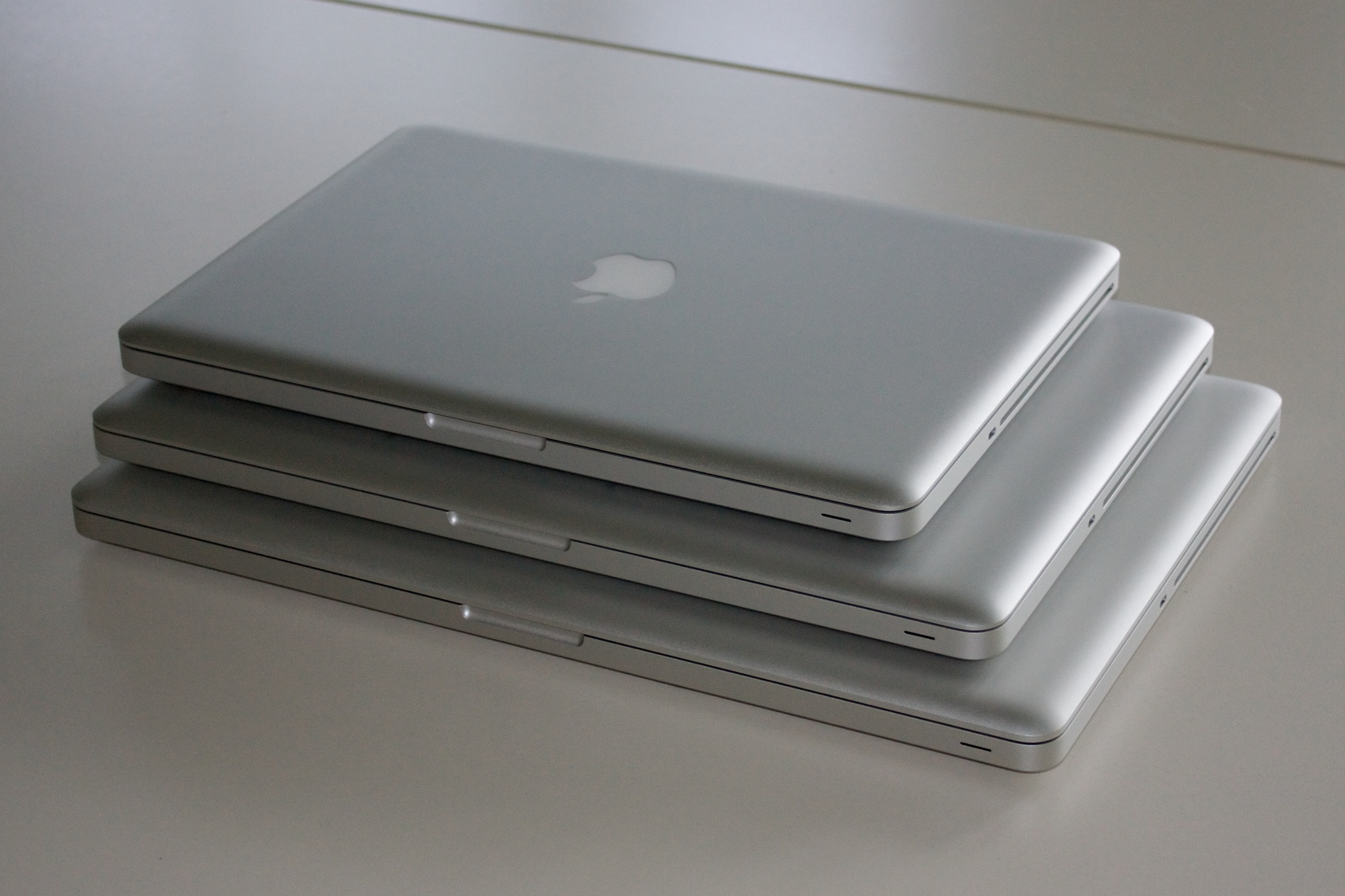
A size comparison of the unibody line of MacBook Pro notebooks

During the MacWorld Expo keynote on January 6, 2009, Phil Schiller announced a 17-inch MacBook Pro with unibody construction. This version diverged from its 15-inch sibling with an anti-glare "matte" screen option (with the glossy finish standard) and a non user-removable lithium polymer battery. Instead of traditional round cells inside the casing, the lithium-ion polymer batteries are shaped and fitted into each notebook to maximally utilize space. The computer has adaptive charging, which uses a chip to optimize the charge flow to reduce wear and tear, and extends the battery's overall life. Battery life for the 17-inch version is quoted at eight hours, with 80 percent of this charge remaining after 1,000 charge-discharge cycles.

At Apple's Worldwide Developers Conference (WWDC) on June 8, 2009, it was announced that the 13-inch unibody MacBook would be upgraded and re-branded as a MacBook Pro, leaving only the white polycarbonate MacBook in the MacBook line. It was also announced that the entire MacBook Pro line would use the non-user-removable battery first introduced in the 17-inch MacBook Pro. The updated MacBook Pro 13- and the 15-inch would each have up to a claimed 7 hours of battery life, while the 17-inch would keep its 8-hour capacity. Some sources even reported up to eight hours of battery life for the 13- and 15-inch MacBook Pro computers during casual use, while others reported around six hours. Like the 17-inch MacBook Pro, Apple claims that they will last around 1,000 charging cycles while still containing 80% of their capacity. Graphics card options stayed the same from the previous release, although the 13-inch and the base model 15-inch, came with only the GeForce 9400M GPU. The screens were also improved, gaining a claimed 60 percent greater color gamut. All of these mid-2009 models also included a FireWire 800 port and all except the 17-inch models would receive an SD card slot. The 17-inch model would retain its ExpressCard/34 slot. For the 13-inch MacBook Pro, the Kensington lock slot was moved to the right side of the chassis. In August 2009, Apple extended the "matte" anti-glare display option to the 15-inch MacBook Pro.

On April 13, 2010, Intel Core i5 and Core i7 CPUs were introduced in the 15- and 17-inch models, while the 13-inch retained the Core 2 Duo with a speed increase. The power brick was redesigned and a high-resolution display (of 1680 × 1050) was announced as an option for the 15-inch models. The 13-inch gained an integrated Nvidia GeForce 320M graphics processing unit (GPU) with 256 MB of shared memory, while the 15- and 17-inch models were upgraded to the GeForce GT 330M, with either 256 or 512 MB of dedicated memory. The 15- and 17-inch models also have an integrated Intel GPU that is built into the Core i5 and i7 processors. The 15-inch model also gained 0.1 pounds (0.045 kg). Save for a third USB 2.0 slot, all the ports on the 17-inch MacBook Pro are the same in type and number as on the 15-inch version. All models come with 4 GB of system memory that is upgradeable to 8 GB. Battery life was also extended further in this update, to an estimated 10 hours for the 13-inch and 8–9 hours on the 15- and 17-inch MacBook Pro computers. This was achieved through both greater power efficiency and adding more battery capacity. One reviewer reported about 6 hours of battery life through a continuous video battery stress test in the 15-inch and another, who called the battery life "unbeatable", reported nearer to 8 in the 13-inch through their "highly demanding battery drain test".

Thunderbolt technology, Sandy Bridge dual-core Intel Core i5 and i7 (on the 13-inch model) or quad-core i7 (on the 15- and 17-inch models) processors, and a high definition FaceTime camera were added on February 24, 2011. Intel HD Graphics 3000 come integrated with the CPU, while the 15- and 17-inch models also utilize AMD Radeon HD 6490M and Radeon HD 6750M graphics cards. Later editions of these models, following the release of OS X Lion, replaced the Expose (F3) key with a Mission Control key, and the Dashboard (F4) key with a Launchpad key. The chassis bottoms are also engraved differently from the 2010 models. The Thunderbolt serial bus platform can achieve speeds of up to 10 Gbit/s, which is up to twice as fast as the USB 3.0 specification, 20 times faster than the USB 2.0 specification, and up to 12 times faster than FireWire 800. Apple says that Thunderbolt can be used to drive displays or to transfer large quantities of data in a short amount of time.

On June 11, 2012, Apple showcased its upgraded Mac notebooks, the Retina MacBook Pro, the new MacBook Air and Mac Pro, OS X Mountain Lion, and iOS 6 at the Worldwide Developers Conference (WWDC) in San Francisco. The new MacBook Pro models were updated with Ivy Bridge processors and USB 3.0 ports, and the default RAM on premium models was increased to 8 GB. Following this announcement, the 17-inch model was discontinued. After a media event on October 22, 2013, Apple discontinued all unibody MacBook Pro computers except for the entry-level 2.5 GHz 13-inch model. Apple discontinued the 13-inch unibody MacBook Pro on October 27, 2016. Prior to its discontinuation it was Apple's only product to still include an optical drive and a FireWire port, and only notebook with a hard disk drive and Ethernet port.

=== Reception ===
Some reviewers praised the new notebook's performance and compact size, the quality of the screen, and sturdy unibody build, which allowed easier upgrading of internal components as compared to the original models. Some reviewers also noted that the new MacBook Pro ran more quietly and at cooler temperatures than aluminum machines. Others, however, criticized the amount of heat generated by the new design.

The Reviewers lamented the loss of a matte screen option for the 2008 unibody MacBook Pro, noting the reflectiveness of the screen in sunlight, even when its brightness was turned all the way up. CNET's Dan Ackerman commented of the mid-2009 models: "According to Apple, the new display offers a wider color gamut, and the screen certainly looks bright and colorful, but we wish the same matte-screen option offered on the 17-inch MacBook Pro was available across the line... While the LED screen means a thinner lid and some battery life benefits, the edge-to-edge glass covering the entire display panel grabs stray light rays with ease, making the glossy screen hard to see in some lighting conditions." By 2011, matte screens were offered for both the 15" and 17" models. Furthermore, the addition of Mini DisplayPort instead of the more popular HDMI was criticized. The relatively low number of ports and lower end technical specifications when compared to similarly priced laptops from other brands were also bemoaned.

Laptop Magazine's Michael Prospero praised the 2010 15-inch model's display, calling it "bright and crisp". He further commented, "While reflections from the glossy display weren't overwhelming, it's also nice to know there's an antiglare option—though only for the higher resolution display. Still, colors were bright, blacks were deep and dark, and viewing angles were excellent both vertically and horizontally." He also lauded the quality of the iSight webcam, the responsiveness of the trackpad, the microphone and speakers, as well as the performance of the new CPUs for the 15" model and the long battery life. Complaints included the price of the notebook, the low number of USB ports, and the lack of HDMI.

CNET praised the automatic graphics switching features of the 15- and 17-inch 2010 models as well as the graphics cards themselves. Acclaim was also given to the Core i5 and i7 CPUs, the multi-touch trackpad, and the addition of audio capabilities to the Mini DisplayPort video output. They also called for the addition of HDMI and the Blu-ray optical disc format, saying that most other computers in the MacBook Pro's price range possessed these features. CNET also criticized the option of a higher-resolution screen in the 15-inch model, saying that "the higher-resolution screen should be included by default."

=== Technical specifications ===
According to Apple, all of these models are obsolete.

Since the RAM and the hard drive on some generations of MacBook Pro are user-serviceable parts, there are aftermarket modifications to enhance the system with up to 16 GB DDR3-1600 RAM (although maximum capacity and frequency depend on the hardware in question), 7,200 rpm hard drives or third-party SSDs. Third-party caddies are also made, allowing the internal optical drive to be replaced with a second internal SATA 2.5-inch hard drive or solid state drive.

Model		Late 2008 and Early 2009			Mid 2009						Mid 2010						Early 2011					Late 2011					Mid 2012			
Component		Penryn Intel Core											Arrandale Intel Core				Sandy Bridge Intel Core										Ivy Bridge Intel Core			
Release date		October 14, 2008 (Note: Starting March 3, 2009, the MB471 model was replaced by MC026 at the same price, with the only differences being 2.66 GHz (T9550) (or optional 2.93 GHz) processor and an optional 256 GB SSD)		January 6, 2009	June 8, 2009						April 13, 2010						February 24, 2011					October 24, 2011					June 11, 2012			
Discontinued date		June 8, 2009			April 13, 2010						February 24, 2011						October 24, 2011					June 11, 2012					October 27, 2016		October 22, 2013	
Unsupported		October 2018									November 12, 2020																November 30, 2022			
MSRP(USD)		$1999	$2499	$2799	$1199	$1499	$1699	$1999	$2299	$2499	$1199	$1499	$1799	$1999	$2199	$2299	$1199	$1499	$1799	$2199	$2499	$1199	$1499	$1799	$2199	$2499	$1199 $1099 after July 29, 2014	$1499	$1799	$2199
Models	Common name and Model number	Late 2008 and Early 2009 15-inch A1286		Early 2009 17-inch A1297	Mid 2009 13-inch A1278		Mid 2009 15-inch A1286			Mid 2009 17-inch A1297	Mid 2010 13-inch A1278		Mid 2010 15-inch A1286			Mid 2010 17-inch A1297	Early 2011 13-inch A1278		Early 2011 15-inch A1286		Early 2011 17-inch A1297	Late 2011 13-inch A1278		Late 2011 15-inch A1286		Late 2011 17-inch A1297	Mid 2012 13-inch A1278		Mid 2012 15-inch A1286	
Models	Model identifier	MacBookPro5,1		MacBookPro5,2	MacBookPro5,5		MacBookPro5,4	MacBookPro5,3		MacBookPro5,2	MacBookPro7,1		MacBookPro6,2			MacBookPro6,1	MacBookPro8,1		MacBookPro8,2		MacBookPro8,3	MacBookPro8,1		MacBookPro8,2		MacBookPro8,3	MacBookPro9,2		MacBookPro9,1	
Models	Apple order number	MB470	MB471; After March 3, 2009: MC026	MB604	MB990	MB991	MC118	MB985	MB986	MC226	MC374	MC375	MC371	MC372	MC373	MC024	MC700	MC724	MC721	MC723	MC725	MD313	MD314	MD318	MD322	MD322	MD101	MD102	MD103	MD104
LED-backlit widescreen glossy display (16:10)		15.4", 1440 × 900		17", 1920 × 1200; Optional matte screen	13.3", 1280 × 800		15.4", 1440 × 900; Optional matte screen			17", 1920 × 1200; Optional matte screen	13.3", 1280 × 800		15.4", 1440 × 900; Optional 1680 × 1050 (glossy or matte)			17", 1920 × 1200; Optional matte screen	13.3", 1280 × 800		15.4", 1440 × 900; Optional 1680 × 1050 (glossy or matte)		17", 1920 × 1200; Optional matte screen	13.3", 1280 × 800		15.4", 1440 × 900; Optional 1680 × 1050 (glossy or matte)		17", 1920 × 1200; Optional matte screen	13.3", 1280 × 800		15.4", 1440 × 900; Optional 1680 × 1050 (glossy or matte)	
Video camera		iSight (480p)															FaceTime HD (720p)													
Processor	Standard	2.4 GHz (P8600) Intel Core 2 Duo Penryn with 3 MB on-chip L2 cache	2.53 GHz (T9400) Intel Core 2 Duo Penryn with 6 MB on-chip L2 cache After March 3, 2009: 2.66 GHz (T9550) Intel Core 2 Duo Penryn with 6 MB on-chip L2 cache	2.66 GHz (T9550) Intel Core 2 Duo Penryn with 6 MB on-chip L2 cache	2.26 GHz (P8400) Intel Core 2 Duo Penryn with 3 MB on-chip L2 cache	2.53 GHz (P8700) Intel Core 2 Duo Penryn with 3 MB on-chip L2 cache		2.66 GHz (P8800) Intel Core 2 Duo Penryn with 3 MB on-chip L2 cache	2.8 GHz (T9600) Intel Core 2 Duo Penryn with 6 MB on-chip L2 cache		2.4 GHz (P8600) Intel Core 2 Duo Penryn with 3 MB on-chip L2 cache	2.66 GHz (P8800) Intel Core 2 Duo Penryn with 3 MB on-chip L2 cache	2.4 GHz (520M) Intel Core i5 Arrandale with 3 MB on-chip L3 cache	2.53 GHz (540M) Intel Core i5 Arrandale with 3 MB on-chip L3 cache	2.66 GHz (620M) Intel Core i7 Arrandale with 4 MB on-chip L3 cache	2.53 GHz (540M) Intel Core i5 Arrandale with 3 MB on-chip L3 cache	2.3 GHz (2415M) Intel Core i5 Sandy Bridge with 3 MB on-chip L3 cache	2.7 GHz (2620M) Intel Core i7 Sandy Bridge with 4 MB on-chip L3 cache	2.0 GHz quad-core (2635QM) Intel Core i7 Sandy Bridge with 6 MB on-chip L3 cache	2.2 GHz quad-core (2720QM) Intel Core i7 Sandy Bridge with 6 MB on-chip L3 cache		2.4 GHz (2435M) Intel Core i5 Sandy Bridge with 3 MB on-chip L3 cache	2.8 GHz (2640M) Intel Core i7 Sandy Bridge with 4 MB on-chip L3 cache	2.2 GHz quad-core (2675QM) Intel Core i7 Sandy Bridge with 6 MB on-chip L3 cache	2.4 GHz quad-core (2760QM) Intel Core i7 Sandy Bridge with 6 MB on-chip L3 cache		2.5 GHz (3210M) Intel Core i5 Ivy Bridge with 3 MB on-chip L3 cache	2.9 GHz (3520M) Intel Core i7 Ivy Bridge with 4 MB on-chip L3 cache	2.3 GHz quad-core (3615QM) Intel Core i7 Ivy Bridge with 6 MB on-chip L3 cache	2.6 GHz quad-core (3720QM) Intel Core i7 Ivy Bridge with 6 MB on-chip L3 cache
Processor	Optional	—N/a	2.8 GHz (T9600) with 6 MB on-chip L2 cache After March 3, 2009: 2.93 GHz (T9800) with 6 MB on-chip L2 cache	2.93 GHz (T9800) with 6 MB on-chip L2 cache	—N/a		3.06 GHz (T9900) with 6 MB on-chip L2 cache				—N/a		2.8 GHz (640M) with 4 MB on-chip L3 cache				—N/a		2.3 GHz (2820QM) with 8 MB on-chip L3 cache			—N/a		2.5 GHz (2860QM) with 8 MB on-chip L3 cache			—N/a		2.7 GHz (3820QM) with 8 MB on-chip L3 cache	
System bus		1,066 MHz front-side bus											2.5 GT/s Intel DMI				5 GT/s Intel DMI													
Memory (two slots)	Standard	2 GB (two 1 GB)	4 GB (two 2 GB)		2 GB (two 1 GB)	4 GB (two 2 GB)																						8 GB (two 4 GB)	4 GB (two 2 GB)	8 GB (two 4 GB)
Memory (two slots)	Expansion	Up to 4 GB initially, or 8 GB with the latest EFI update	Up to 8 GB		Up to 8 GB						Up to 16 GB		Up to 8 GB						Up to 16 GB											
Memory (two slots)	Speed	1,066 MHz PC3-8500 DDR3 SDRAM															1,333 MHz PC3-10600 1.5 V DDR3 SDRAM; Expandable to 16 GB 1,600 MHz PC3-12800 DDR3 SDRAM										1,600 MHz PC3-12800 1.35 V DDR3 SDRAM			
Graphics		Nvidia GeForce 9400M with 256 MB DDR3 SDRAM shared with main memory and Nvidia GeForce 9600M GT with 256 MB GDDR3 SDRAM; Can switch between the two (but cannot use both)			Nvidia GeForce 9400M with 256 MB DDR3 SDRAM shared with main memory			Nvidia GeForce 9400M with 256 MB DDR3 SDRAM shared with main memory and Nvidia GeForce 9600M GT with 256 MB GDDR3 SDRAM; Can switch between the two (but cannot use both)	Nvidia GeForce 9400M with 256 MB DDR3 SDRAM shared with main memory and Nvidia GeForce 9600M GT with 512 MB GDDR3 SDRAM; Can switch between the two (but cannot use both)		Nvidia GeForce GT 320M with 256 MB DDR3 SDRAM shared with main memory		Intel HD Graphics with 256 MB DDR3 SDRAM shared with main memory and Nvidia GeForce GT 330M with 256 MB GDDR3 SDRAM; Automatically switches between graphics hardware when running OS X		Intel HD Graphics with 256 MB DDR3 SDRAM shared with main memory and Nvidia GeForce GT 330M with 512 MB GDDR3 SDRAM; Automatically switches between graphics hardware when running OS X		Intel HD Graphics 3000 with 384 MB (512 MB with 8 GB RAM installed) DDR3 SDRAM shared with main memory		Intel HD Graphics 3000 with 384 MB DDR3 SDRAM shared with main memory and AMD Radeon HD 6490M with 256 MB GDDR5 memory or AMD Radeon HD 6750M with 1 GB GDDR5 SDRAM; Automatically switches between graphics hardware when running OS X		Intel HD Graphics 3000 with 384 MB DDR3 SDRAM shared with main memory and AMD Radeon HD 6750M with 1 GB GDDR5 SDRAM; Automatically switches between graphics hardware when running OS X	Intel HD Graphics 3000 with 384 MB DDR3 SDRAM shared with main memory		Intel HD Graphics 3000 with 384 MB DDR3 SDRAM shared with main memory and AMD Radeon HD 6750M with 512 MB GDDR5 SDRAM or AMD Radeon HD 6770M with 1 GB GDDR5 SDRAM; Automatically switches between graphics hardware when running OS X		Intel HD Graphics 3000 with 384 MB DDR3 SDRAM shared with main memory and AMD Radeon HD 6770M with 1 GB GDDR5 SDRAM; Automatically switches between graphics hardware when running OS X	Intel HD Graphics 4000 with DDR3 SDRAM shared with main memory		Intel HD Graphics 4000 with DDR3 SDRAM shared with main memory and Nvidia GeForce GT 650M with 512 MB GDDR5 memory (base model) or 1 GB GDDR5 SDRAM; Automatically switches between graphics hardware when running OS X	
Storage	Standard	250 GB SATA 5,400 rpm	320 GB SATA 5,400 rpm		160 GB SATA 5,400 rpm	250 GB SATA 5,400 rpm		320 GB SATA 5,400 rpm	500 GB SATA 5,400 rpm		250 GB SATA 5,400 rpm	320 GB SATA 5,400 rpm		500 GB SATA 5,400 rpm			320 GB SATA 5,400 rpm	500 GB SATA 5,400 rpm		750 GB SATA 5,400 rpm		500 GB SATA 5,400 rpm	750 GB SATA 5,400 rpm	500 GB SATA 5,400 rpm	750 GB SATA 5,400 rpm	750 GB SATA 5,400 rpm	500 GB SATA 5,400 rpm	750 GB SATA 5,400 rpm	500 GB SATA 5,400 rpm	750 GB SATA 5,400 rpm
Storage	Options	250 7,200 rpm, 320 5,400 rpm, 320 7,200 rpm, 128 GB SSD	250 7,200 rpm, 320 7,200 rpm, 128 GB SSD; After March 3, 2009: 250 7,200 rpm, 320 7,200 rpm, 128 GB SSD, 256 GB SSD	320 7,200 rpm, 128 GB SSD, 256 GB SSD	320 5,400 rpm, 500 5,400 rpm, 128 GB SSD, 256 GB SSD		320 5,400 rpm, 500 5,400 rpm, 320 7,200 rpm, 500 7,200 rpm, 128 GB SSD, 256 GB SSD			500 7,200 rpm, 128 GB SSD, 256 GB SSD	320 5,400 rpm, 500 5,400 rpm, 128 GB SSD, 256 GB SSD, 512 GB SSD		500 5,400 rpm, 500 7,200 rpm, 128 GB SSD, 256 GB SSD, 512 GB SSD				500 5,400 rpm, 500 7,200 rpm, 750 7,200 rpm, 128 GB SSD, 256 GB SSD, 512 GB SSD		500 7,200 rpm, 128 GB SSD, 256 GB SSD, 512 GB SSD			750 GB 5,400 rpm, 128 GB SSD, 256 GB SSD, 512 GB SSD	1 TB 5,400 rpm, 128 GB SSD, 256 GB SSD, 512 GB SSD	750 GB 5,400 rpm, 750 GB 7,200 rpm, 128 GB SSD, 256 GB SSD, 512 GB SSD	750 GB 7,200 rpm, 128 GB SSD, 256 GB SSD, 512 GB SSD	750 GB 7,200 rpm, 128 GB SSD, 256 GB SSD, 512 GB SSD	750 GB 5,400 rpm, 128 GB SSD, 256 GB SSD, 512 GB SSD	1 TB 5,400 rpm, 128 GB SSD, 256 GB SSD, 512 GB SSD	750 GB 5,400 rpm, 750 GB 7,200 rpm, 1 TB 5,400 rpm, 128 GB SSD, 256 GB SSD, 512 GB SSD	750 GB 7,200 rpm, 1 TB 5,400 rpm, 128 GB SSD, 256 GB SSD, 512 GB SSD
Storage	Transfer rate	SATA 3 Gbit/s															SATA 6 Gbit/s													
Optical disc drive		SuperDrive: 4× DVD±R DL writes, 8× DVD+/−R read/write, 8× DVD+RW writes, 6× DVD-RW writes, 24× CD-R, and 16× CD-RW recording																												
Connectivity	Wi-Fi	Integrated AirPort Extreme (802.11a/b/g/draft-n) (Broadcom BCM4322 2 × 2 chipset, up to 300 Mbit/s)															Integrated AirPort Extreme (802.11a/b/g/n) (Broadcom BCM4331 3 × 3 chipset, up to 450 Mbit/s)													
Connectivity	Bluetooth	Bluetooth 2.1 + EDR																									Bluetooth 4.0			
Connectivity	Ethernet	Gigabit Ethernet																												
Peripheral connections	Cards	ExpressCard/34			SDXC card slot					ExpressCard/34	SDXC card slot					ExpressCard/34	SDXC card slot				ExpressCard/34	SDXC card slot				ExpressCard/34	SDXC card slot			
Peripheral connections	USB	USB 2.0 (two ports)		USB 2.0 (three ports)	USB 2.0 (two ports)					USB 2.0 (three ports)	USB 2.0 (two ports)					USB 2.0 (three ports)	USB 2.0 (two ports)				USB 2.0 (three ports)	USB 2.0 (two ports)				USB 2.0 (three ports)	USB 3.0 (two ports)			
Peripheral connections	Video out	Mini DisplayPort (without audio support)									Mini DisplayPort (with audio support)						Thunderbolt port													
Peripheral connections	FireWire	FireWire 800																												
Audio		Built-in stereo speakers, Audio line-in/out																												
Operating system	Minimum	Mac OS X 10.5 Leopard									Mac OS X 10.6 Snow Leopard											Mac OS X 10.7 Lion								
Operating system	Latest release	OS X 10.11 El Capitan									macOS 10.13 High Sierra																macOS 10.15 Catalina			
Battery (lithium polymer, non-removable except in original 15")		50 Wh removable		95 Wh	60 Wh		73 Wh			95 Wh	63.5 Wh		77.5 Wh			95 Wh	63.5 Wh		77.5 Wh		95 Wh	63.5 Wh		77.5 Wh		95 Wh	63.5 Wh		77.5 Wh	
Weight		5.5 lb (2.5 kg)		6.6 lb (3.0 kg)	4.50 lb (2.04 kg)		5.5 lb (2.5 kg)			6.6 lb (3.0 kg)	4.50 lb (2.04 kg)		5.6 lb (2.5 kg)			6.6 lb (3.0 kg)	4.50 lb (2.04 kg)		5.6 lb (2.5 kg)		6.6 lb (3.0 kg)	4.50 lb (2.04 kg)		5.6 lb (2.5 kg)		6.6 lb (3.0 kg)	4.50 lb (2.04 kg)		5.6 lb (2.5 kg)	
Dimensions (width × depth × thickness)		14.35 in × 9.82 in × 0.95 in (36.4 cm × 24.9 cm × 2.4 cm)		15.47 in × 10.51 in × 0.98 in (39.3 cm × 26.7 cm × 2.5 cm)	12.78 in × 8.94 in × 0.95 in (32.5 cm × 22.7 cm × 2.4 cm)		14.35 in × 9.82 in × 0.95 in (36.4 cm × 24.9 cm × 2.4 cm)			15.47 in × 10.51 in × 0.98 in (39.3 cm × 26.7 cm × 2.5 cm)	12.78 in × 8.94 in × 0.95 in (32.5 cm × 22.7 cm × 2.4 cm)		14.35 in × 9.82 in × 0.95 in (36.4 cm × 24.9 cm × 2.4 cm)			15.47 in × 10.51 in × 0.98 in (39.3 cm × 26.7 cm × 2.5 cm)	12.78 in × 8.94 in × 0.95 in (32.5 cm × 22.7 cm × 2.4 cm)		14.35 in × 9.82 in × 0.95 in (36.4 cm × 24.9 cm × 2.4 cm)		15.47 in × 10.51 in × 0.98 in (39.3 cm × 26.7 cm × 2.5 cm)	12.78 in × 8.94 in × 0.95 in (32.5 cm × 22.7 cm × 2.4 cm)		14.35 in × 9.82 in × 0.95 in (36.4 cm × 24.9 cm × 2.4 cm)		15.47 in × 10.51 in × 0.98 in (39.3 cm × 26.7 cm × 2.5 cm)	12.78 in × 8.94 in × 0.95 in (32.5 cm × 22.7 cm × 2.4 cm)		14.35 in × 9.82 in × 0.95 in (36.4 cm × 24.9 cm × 2.4 cm)	

=== Early and late 2011 model GPU problems ===
Early and late 2011 models with a GPU; 15" & 17"; reportedly suffer from manufacturing problems leading to overheating, graphical problems, and eventually complete GPU and logic board failure. A similar but nonidentical problem affected iMac GPUs which were later recalled by Apple. The problem was covered by many articles in Mac-focused magazines, starting late 2013 throughout 2014. In August 2014 the law firm Whitfield Bryson & Mason LLP had begun investigating the problem to determine if any legal claim exists. On October 28, 2014, the firm announced that it has filed a class-action lawsuit in a California federal court against Apple. The lawsuit will cover residents residing in both California and Florida who have purchased a 2011 MacBook Pro notebook with an AMD graphics card. The firm is also investigating similar cases across the United States. On February 20, 2015, Apple instituted the "MacBook Pro Repair Extension Program for Video Issues". This "will repair affected MacBook Pro systems, free of charge". The program covered affected MacBook Pro models until December 31, 2016, four years from original date of sale.

== Retina (2012–2015) ==
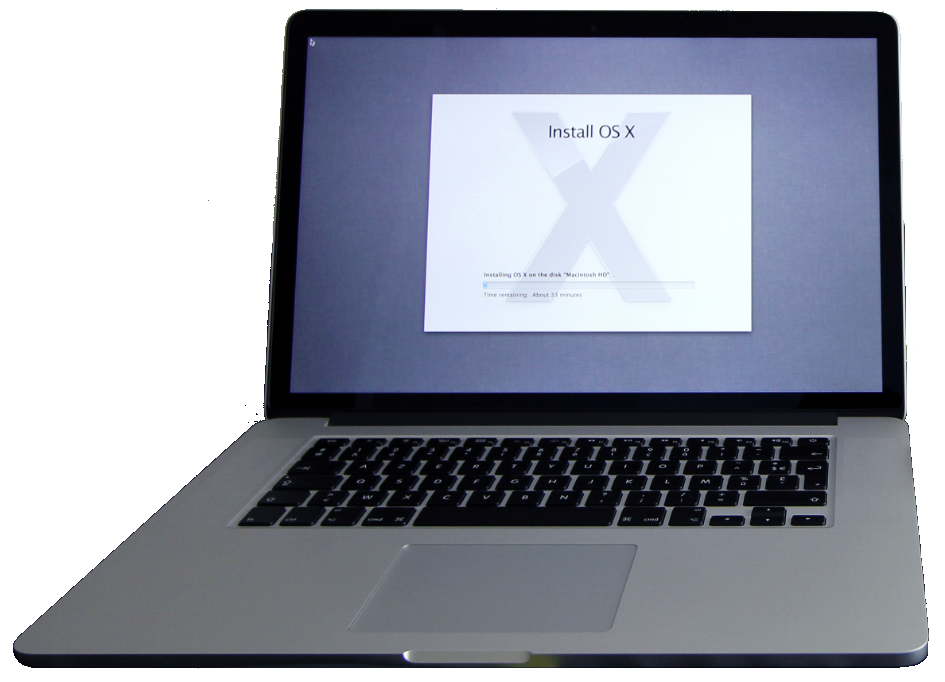
MacBook Pro (Retina, 15-inch, Mid-2012)

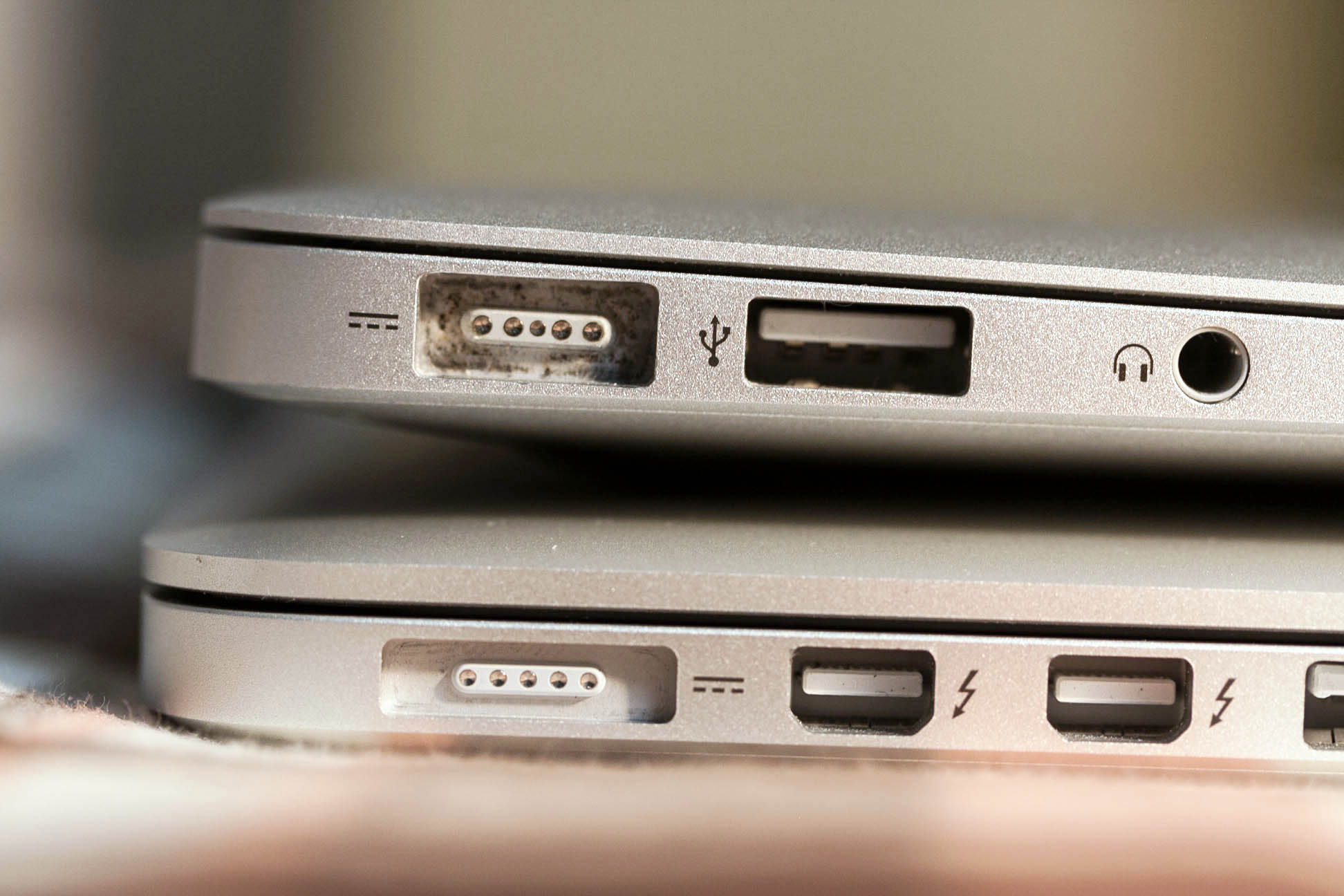
A MacBook Air (top) and a Retina MacBook Pro (bottom). The MacBook Pro has a thinner MagSafe 2 port and two Thunderbolt ports.

On June 11, 2012, at the Apple Worldwide Developers Conference in San Francisco, Apple introduced the 15-inch Retina MacBook Pro, marketed as the "MacBook Pro with Retina display" to differentiate it from the previous model. The model includes Intel's third-generation Core i7 processors (Ivy Bridge microarchitecture). It made solid-state storage (SSD) standard, upgraded to USB 3.0, added an additional Thunderbolt port, added HDMI, and included a high-resolution 2880 × 1800 Retina display. It brought a thinner MagSafe connector, dubbed "MagSafe 2". Apple also claims improved speakers and microphones and a new system for cooling the notebook with improved fans. The 15-inch model is 25% thinner than its predecessor. The model name is no longer placed at the bottom of the screen bezel; instead, it is found on the underside of the chassis, similar to an iOS device, and is the first Macintosh notebook to not have its model name visible during normal use.

It eliminated Ethernet and FireWire 800 ports, but Thunderbolt adapters were made available for purchase. It also eliminated the Kensington lock slot and battery indicator button and light on the side of the chassis found on the previous generation models. It did not include an optical drive, being the first professional notebook since the PowerBook 2400c to not include one.

Apple introduced a 13-inch version on October 23, 2012, with specifications similar but slightly inferior to the 15-inch, such as less powerful processors.

The Retina models also have fewer user-accessible upgrade or replacement options than previous MacBooks. Unlike in previous generations, the memory is soldered onto the logic board and is not upgradable. The solid state drive is not soldered and can be replaced by users, although it has a proprietary connector and form factor. The battery is glued into place; attempts to remove it may destroy the battery and/or trackpad. The entire case uses proprietary pentalobe screws and cannot be disassembled with standard tools. While the battery is glued in, recycling companies have stated that the design is only "mildly inconvenient" and does not hamper the recycling process.

On February 13, 2013, Apple announced updated prices and processors and increased the memory of the high-end 15-inch model to 16 GB.

On October 22, 2013, Apple updated the line with Intel's Haswell processors and Iris Graphics, 802.11ac Wi-Fi, Thunderbolt 2, and PCIe-based flash storage. The chassis of the 13-inch version was slightly slimmed to 0.71 inches (18 mm) to match the 15-inch model. The lower-end 15-inch model only included integrated graphics while the higher-end model continued to include a discrete Nvidia graphics card in addition to integrated graphics. Support for 4K video output via HDMI was added but limited the maximum number of external displays from three to two. On July 29, 2014, Apple announced new models with updated prices and processors.

On March 9, 2015, the 13-inch model was updated with Intel Broadwell processors, Iris 6100 graphics, faster flash storage (based on PCIe 2.0 × 4 technology), faster RAM (upgraded from 1600 MHZ to 1866 MHZ), increased battery life (extended to 10 hours), and a Force Touch trackpad. On May 19, 2015, a 15-inch model was released with a Force Touch trackpad, AMD Radeon R9 M370X, SSD based on PCIe 3.0 × 4 technology, and battery life extended to 9 hours. The higher-end 15-inch model also added support for dual-cable output to 5120 × 2880 displays. The 15-inch models were released with the same Intel Haswell processors and Iris Pro graphics as the 2014 models due to a delay in shipment of newer Broadwell quad-core processors. Apple continued to sell the 2015 15-inch model until July 2018.

=== Reception ===
The Retina MacBook Pro received positive reviews of the Retina Display, flash storage and power. It was criticized, however, for its high price and lack of an Ethernet port and optical drive. Roman Loyola of Macworld said that the Retina MacBook Pro was "groundbreaking" and made people "rethink how they use technology". He praised the inclusion of USB 3.0 and the slimmer body. Dan Ackerman of CNET commented "I've previously called the 15-inch MacBook Pro one of the most universally useful all-around laptops you can buy. This new version adds to that with HDMI, faster ports, and more portability. But it also subtracts from that with its exclusion of an optical drive and Ethernet port, plus its very high starting price. The Pro and Retina Pro are clearly two laptops designed for two different users, and with the exception of all-day commuters who need something closer to a MacBook Air or ultrabook, one of the two branches of the MacBook Pro family tree is still probably the most universally useful laptop you can buy."

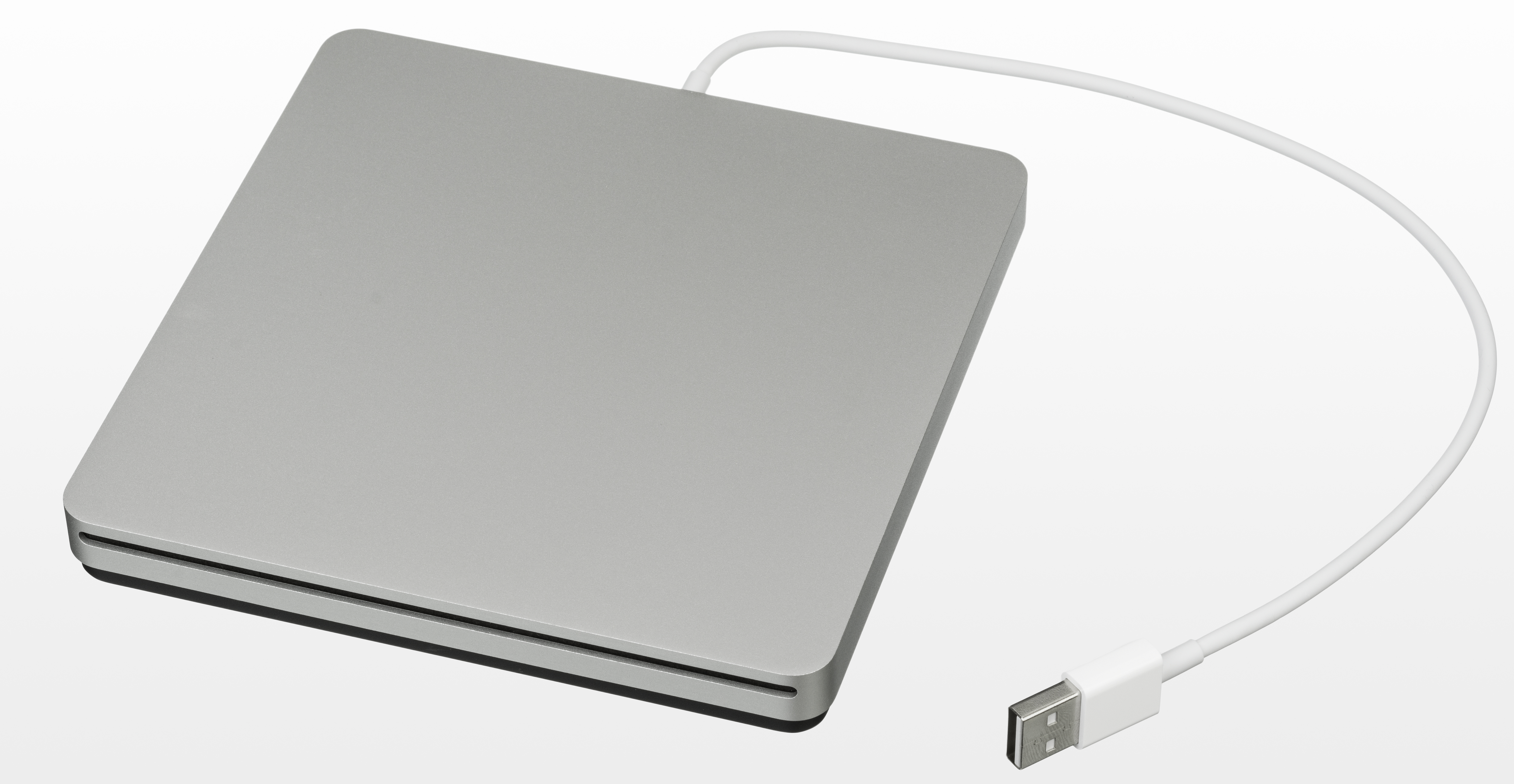
The Retina MacBook line has no internal optical drive. External drives such as Apple's SuperDrive (pictured) can be used instead.

Joel Santo Domingo of PC Magazine gave the MacBook Pro an "Editor's Choice" rating. He praised its "brilliant Retina display", the thin design, port selection and speedy storage, and highlighted the expandability via Thunderbolt ports which support up to seven devices each. David Pogue of The New York Times praised the 15-inch model's screen, keyboard, sound, start-up time, cosmetics, battery life, storage, and RAM capacity. They criticized the lack of a SuperDrive, pricing, and the MagSafe 2 power connector's lack of backwards compatibility with the older MagSafe design.

The Retina Display on the MacBook Pro have been criticized for "image retention", specifically for displays manufactured by LG. Many users also complained the Anti-reflective coating on their screens could wear off easily, which is an issue known as "staingate".

In 2017, one year after the introduction of the Touch Bar of the MacBook Pro, the original lead developer of Tumblr Marco Arment wrote an evocative article in which he declared the Retina MacBook Pro the best laptop ever made. The sentiment was shared by many users of various social platforms.

=== Repairability and environmental concerns ===
Apple was criticized for gluing the battery into the case, making it harder to be recycled (ease of disassembly is an EPEAT criterion), but some recycling companies have stated that the design is only "mildly inconvenient" and does not hamper the recycling process. Greenpeace spokesman Casey Harrell said Apple "has pitted design against the environment—and chosen design. They're making a big bet that people don't care, but recycling is a big issue." Wired also criticized Apple's recyclability claims in 2012: "[t]he design may well be comprised of 'highly recyclable aluminum and glass'—but my friends in the electronics recycling industry tell me they have no way of recycling aluminum that has glass glued to it like Apple did with both this machine and the recent iPad."

=== Battery problems ===
In June 2019, Apple announced a worldwide recall for certain 2015 15" MacBook Pro computers after receiving at least 26 reports of batteries becoming hot enough to produce smoke and inflict minor burns or property damage. The problem affected some 432,000 computers, mostly sold between September 2015 and February 2017. The company asked customers to stop using their computers until Apple could replace the batteries.

In September 2019, India's Directorate General of Civil Aviation said MacBook Pro computers could dangerously overheat, leading the national carrier Air India to ban the model on its flights.

=== Technical specifications ===
Obsolete	Vintage

Apple model name		Mid 2012		Late 2012		Early 2013			Late 2013					Mid 2014				Early 2015		Mid 2015	
Component		Ivy Bridge Intel Core							Haswell Intel Core									Broadwell Intel Core		Haswell Intel Core	
Timetable	Released	June 11, 2012		October 23, 2012		February 13, 2013			October 22, 2013					July 29, 2014				March 9, 2015		May 19, 2015	
Timetable	Discontinued	February 13, 2013			October 22, 2013				July 29, 2014					March 9, 2015		May 19, 2015		June 5, 2017		July 12, 2018	
Timetable	Unsupported	November 30, 2022							September 26, 2023									July 29, 2024			
MSRP(USD)		$2199	$2799	$1999	$1699 $1499 after February 13, 2013	$1699	$2199	$2799	$1299	$1499	$1799	$1999	$2599	$1299 $1499	$1799	$1999	$2499	$1299	$1799	$1999	$2499
Models	Common name & model number	Mid 2012 15-inch A1398		Late 2012 – Early 2013 13-inch A1425			Early 2013 15-inch A1398		Late 2013 13-inch A1502			Late 2013 15-inch A1398		Mid 2014 13-inch A1502		Mid 2014 15-inch A1398		Early 2015 13-inch A1502		Mid 2015 15-inch A1398	
Models	Model identifier	MacBookPro10,1		MacBookPro10,2			MacBookPro10,1		MacBookPro11,1			MacBook; Pro11,2	MacBook; Pro11,3	MacBookPro11,1		MacBook; Pro11,2	MacBook; Pro11,3	MacBookPro12,1		MacBookPro11,4	MacBookPro11,5
Models	Apple order number	MC975	MC976; MD831	MD213	MD212	ME662	ME664	ME665	ME864	ME865	ME866	ME293	ME294	MGX72	MGX92	MGXA2	MGXC2	MF839	MF841	MJLQ2	MJLT2
Display	Size	15.4", 2880 × 1800, 220 ppi		13.3", 2560 × 1600, 227 ppi			15.4", 2880 × 1800, 220 ppi		13.3", 2560 × 1600, 227 ppi			15.4", 2880 × 1800, 220 ppi		13.3", 2560 × 1600, 227 ppi		15.4", 2880 × 1800, 220 ppi		13.3", 2560 × 1600, 227 ppi		15.4", 2880 × 1800, 220 ppi	
Display	Kind	LED-backlit 16∶10 widescreen Retina display																			
Video camera		FaceTime HD (720p)																			
Processor	Standard	2.3 GHz 4-core Intel Core i7 (3615QM) Ivy Bridge with 6 MB on-chip L3 cache	2.6 GHz 4-core Intel Core i7 (3720QM) Ivy Bridge with 6 MB on-chip L3 cache	2.5 GHz 2-core Intel Core i5 (3210M) Ivy Bridge with 3 MB shared L3 cache		2.6 GHz 2-core Intel Core i5 (3230M) Ivy Bridge with 3 MB shared L3 cache	2.4 GHz 4-core Intel Core i7 (3635QM) Ivy Bridge with 6 MB on-chip L3 cache	2.7 GHz 4-core Intel Core i7 (3740QM) Ivy Bridge with 6 MB on-chip L3 cache	2.4 GHz 2-core Intel Core i5 (4258U) Haswell with 3 MB shared L3 cache		2.6 GHz 2-core Intel Core i5 (4288U) Haswell with 3 MB shared L3 cache	2.0 GHz 4-core Intel Core i7 (4750HQ) Haswell with 6 MB on-chip L3 and 128 MB L4 cache (Crystalwell)	2.3 GHz 4-core Intel Core i7 (4850HQ) Haswell with 6 MB on-chip L3 cache and 128 MB L4 cache (Crystalwell)	2.6 GHz 2-core Intel Core i5 (4278U) Haswell with 3 MB shared L3 cache	2.8 GHz 2-core Intel Core i5 (4308U) Haswell with 3 MB shared L3 cache	2.2 GHz 4-core Intel Core i7 (4770HQ) Haswell with 6 MB on-chip L3 cache and 128 MB L4 cache (Crystalwell)	2.5 GHz 4-core Intel Core i7 (4870HQ) Haswell with 6 MB on-chip L3 cache and 128 MB L4 cache (Crystalwell)	2.7 GHz 2-core Intel Core i5 (5257U) Broadwell with 3 MB shared L3 cache	2.9 GHz 2-core Intel Core i5 (5287U) Broadwell with 3 MB shared L3 cache	2.2 GHz 4-core Intel Core i7 (4770HQ) Haswell with 6 MB on-chip L3 cache and 128 MB L4 cache (Crystalwell)	2.5 GHz 4-core Intel Core i7 (4870HQ) Haswell with 6 MB on-chip L3 cache and 128 MB L4 cache (Crystalwell)
Processor	Optional	—N/a	2.7 GHz Intel Core i7 (3820QM) Ivy Bridge with 8 MB on-chip L3 cache	2.9 GHz 2-core Intel Core i7 (3520M) Ivy Bridge with 4 MB shared L3 cache		3.0 GHz 2-core Intel Core i7 (3540M) Ivy Bridge with 4 MB shared L3 cache	2.8 GHz 4-core Intel Core i7 (3840QM) Ivy Bridge with 8 MB on-chip L3 cache		2.8 GHz 2-core Intel Core i7 (4558U) Haswell with 4 MB shared L3 cache			2.6 GHz 4-core Intel Core i7 (4960HQ) Haswell with 6 MB on-chip L3 cache and 128 MB L4 cache (Crystalwell)		3.0 GHz 2-core Intel Core i7 (4578U) Haswell with 4 MB shared L3 cache		2.8 GHz 4-core Intel Core i7 (4980HQ) Haswell with 6 MB on-chip L3 cache and 128 MB L4 cache (Crystalwell)		3.1 GHz 2-core Intel Core i7 Broadwell (5557U) with 4 MB shared L3 cache		2.8 GHz 4-core Intel Core i7 (4980HQ) Haswell with 6 MB on-chip L3 cache and 128 MB L4 cache (Crystalwell)	
System bus		Intel DMI 5 GT/s																			
Memory	Standard built-in onboard	8 GB		8 GB			8 GB	16 GB	4 GB	8 GB			16 GB	8 GB		16 GB		8 GB		16 GB	
Memory	Optional at time of purchase only	16 GB		8 GB			16 GB	16 GB	16 GB				16 GB	16 GB		16 GB		16 GB		16 GB	
Memory	Format	1600 MHz PC3-12800 DDR3L SDRAM																1866 MHz PC3-14900 LPDDR3 SDRAM		1600 MHz PC3-12800 DDR3L SDRAM	
Graphics		Intel HD Graphics 4000 with DDR3L SDRAM shared with main memory and Nvidia GeForce GT 650M with 1 GB GDDR5 SDRAM; Automatically switches between graphics hardware		Intel HD Graphics 4000 with DDR3L SDRAM shared with main memory		Intel HD Graphics 4000 with DDR3L SDRAM shared with main memory	Intel HD Graphics 4000 with DDR3L SDRAM shared with main memory and Nvidia GeForce GT 650M with 1 GB GDDR5 SDRAM; Automatically switches between graphics hardware		Intel Iris 5100 Graphics with DDR SDRAM shared with main memory			Intel Iris Pro 5200 Graphics with 128 MB eDRAM	Intel Iris Pro 5200 Graphics with 128 MB eDRAM and Nvidia GeForce GT 750M with 2 GB GDDR5 SDRAM; Automatically switches between graphics hardware	Intel Iris 5100 Graphics with DDR SDRAM shared with main memory		Intel Iris Pro 5200 Graphics with 128 MB eDRAM	Intel Iris Pro 5200 Graphics with 128 MB eDRAM and Nvidia GeForce GT 750M with 2 GB GDDR5 SDRAM; Automatically switches between graphics hardware	Intel Iris 6100 Graphics with LPDDR3 SDRAM shared with main memory		Intel Iris Pro 5200 Graphics with 128 MB eDRAM	Intel Iris Pro 5200 Graphics with 128 MB eDRAM and AMD Radeon R9 M370X with 2 GB GDDR5 SDRAM; Automatically switches between graphics hardware
Storage	Standard	256 GB	512 GB	256 GB	128 GB	256 GB		512 GB	128 GB	256 GB	512 GB	256 GB	512 GB	128 GB, 256 GB	512 GB	256 GB	512 GB	128 GB	256 GB		512 GB
Storage	Optional	256 GB	768 GB	512 GB, 768 GB	256 GB, 512 GB, 768 GB	512 GB, 768 GB			128 GB	256 GB	1 TB	512 GB, 1 TB	1 TB	512 GB, 768 GB, 1 TB	768 GB, 1 TB	512 GB, 1 TB	1 TB			512 GB, 1 TB	1 TB
Storage	Interface	mSATA 6 Gbit/s SSD							PCIe 2.0 ×2 5.0 GT/s (8 Gbit/s) SSD									PCIe 2.0 ×4 5.0 GT/s (16 Gbit/s) SSD		PCIe 3.0 ×4 8.0 GT/s (31.5 Gbit/s) SSD	
Wi-Fi		Integrated Wi-Fi 4 (802.11a/b/g/n) (2.4 and 5 GHz, up to 450 Mbit/s) (Broadcom BCM4331 3 × 3 chipset)							Integrated Wi-Fi 5 (802.11a/b/g/n/ac) (2.4 and 5 GHz, up to 1.3 Gbit/s) (Broadcom BCM4360 3 × 3 chipset)												
Bluetooth		Bluetooth 4.0 wireless technology																			
Peripheral connections		SDXC card slot Two USB 3.0; Audio line out (analog/optical)																			
Peripheral connections		Two Thunderbolt ports Supports two 2560 × 1600 displays							Two Thunderbolt 2 ports Supports two 2560 × 1600 displays			Two Thunderbolt 2 ports Supports two 3840 × 2160 displays		Two Thunderbolt 2 ports Supports two 2560 × 1600 displays		Two Thunderbolt 2 ports Supports two 3840 × 2160 displays		Two Thunderbolt 2 ports Supports two 3840 × 2160 displays		Two Thunderbolt 2 ports Supports two 3840 × 2160 displays (Iris Graphics) or one 5120 × 2880 dual-cable display (Radeon R9)	
Peripheral connections		HDMI port Supports 1920 × 1200 output							HDMI port Supports 3840 × 2160 @ 30 Hz or 4096 × 2160 @ 24 Hz output												
Battery (Li-Poly Battery, non-removable)		95.0 Wh		74 Wh			95.0 Wh		71.8 Wh			95.0 Wh		74.9 Wh		95.0 Wh		74.9 Wh		99.5 Wh	
Operating system	Minimum	OS X 10.7 Lion		OS X 10.8 Mountain Lion					OS X 10.9 Mavericks									OS X 10.10 Yosemite			
Operating system	Latest	macOS 10.15 Catalina							macOS 11 Big Sur									macOS 12 Monterey			
Weight		4.46 lb (2.02 kg)		3.57 lb (1.62 kg)			4.46 lb (2.02 kg)		3.46 lb (1.57 kg)			4.46 lb (2.02 kg)		3.48 lb (1.58 kg)		4.46 lb (2.02 kg)		3.48 lb (1.58 kg)		4.49 lb (2.04 kg)	
Dimensions (width × depth × thickness)		14.13 in × 9.73 in × 0.71 in (35.9 cm × 24.7 cm × 1.8 cm)		12.35 in × 8.62 in × 0.75 in (31.4 cm × 21.9 cm × 1.9 cm)			14.13 in × 9.73 in × 0.71 in (35.9 cm × 24.7 cm × 1.8 cm)		12.35 in × 8.62 in × 0.75 in (31.4 cm × 21.9 cm × 1.9 cm)			14.13 in × 9.73 in × 0.71 in (35.9 cm × 24.7 cm × 1.8 cm)		12.35 in × 8.62 in × 0.71 in (31.4 cm × 21.9 cm × 1.8 cm)		14.13 in × 9.73 in × 0.71 in (35.9 cm × 24.7 cm × 1.8 cm)		12.35 in × 8.62 in × 0.71 in (31.4 cm × 21.9 cm × 1.8 cm)		14.13 in × 9.73 in × 0.71 in (35.9 cm × 24.7 cm × 1.8 cm)	

== Touch Bar (2016–2020) ==
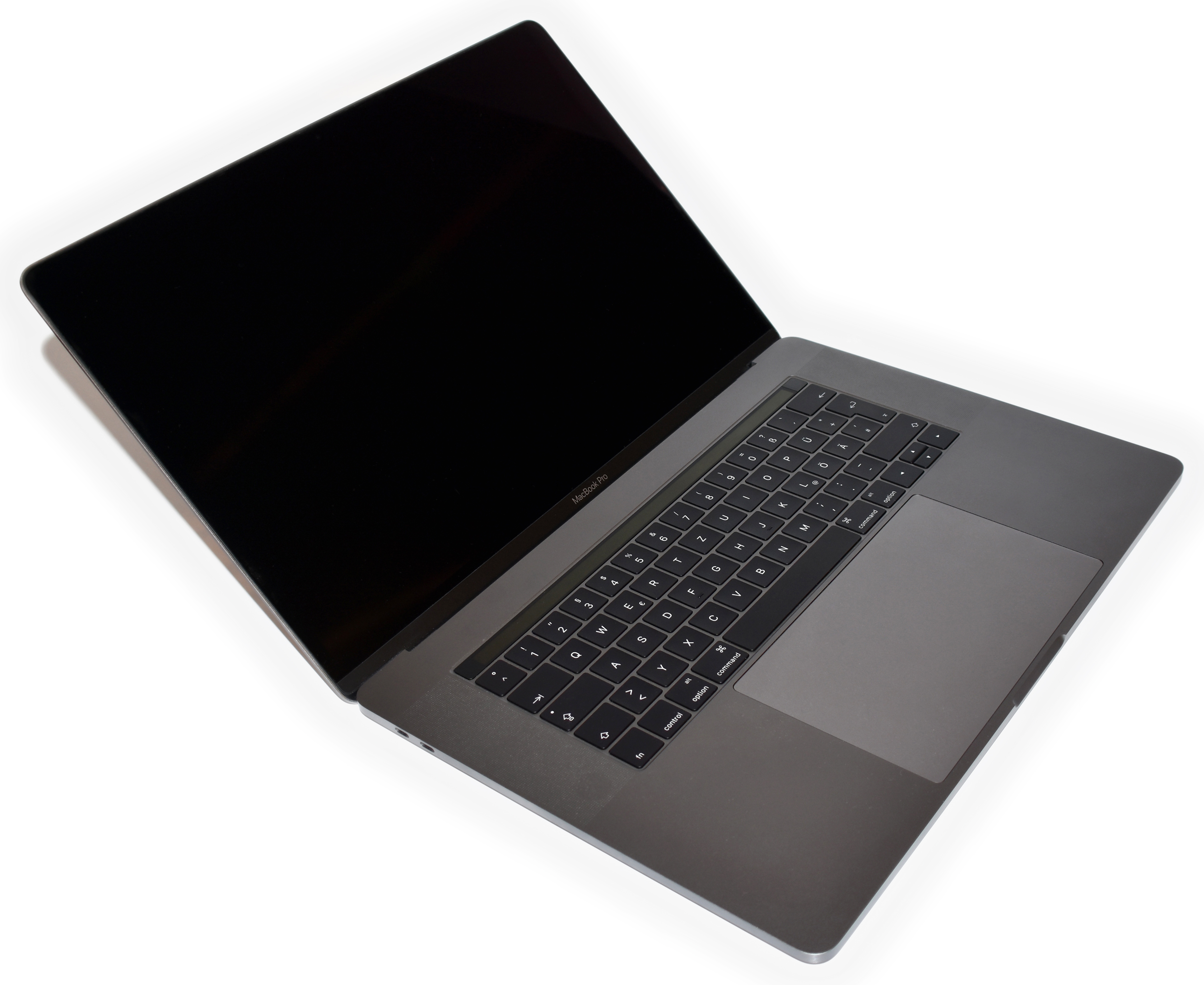
The MacBook Pro (15-inch, 2016)

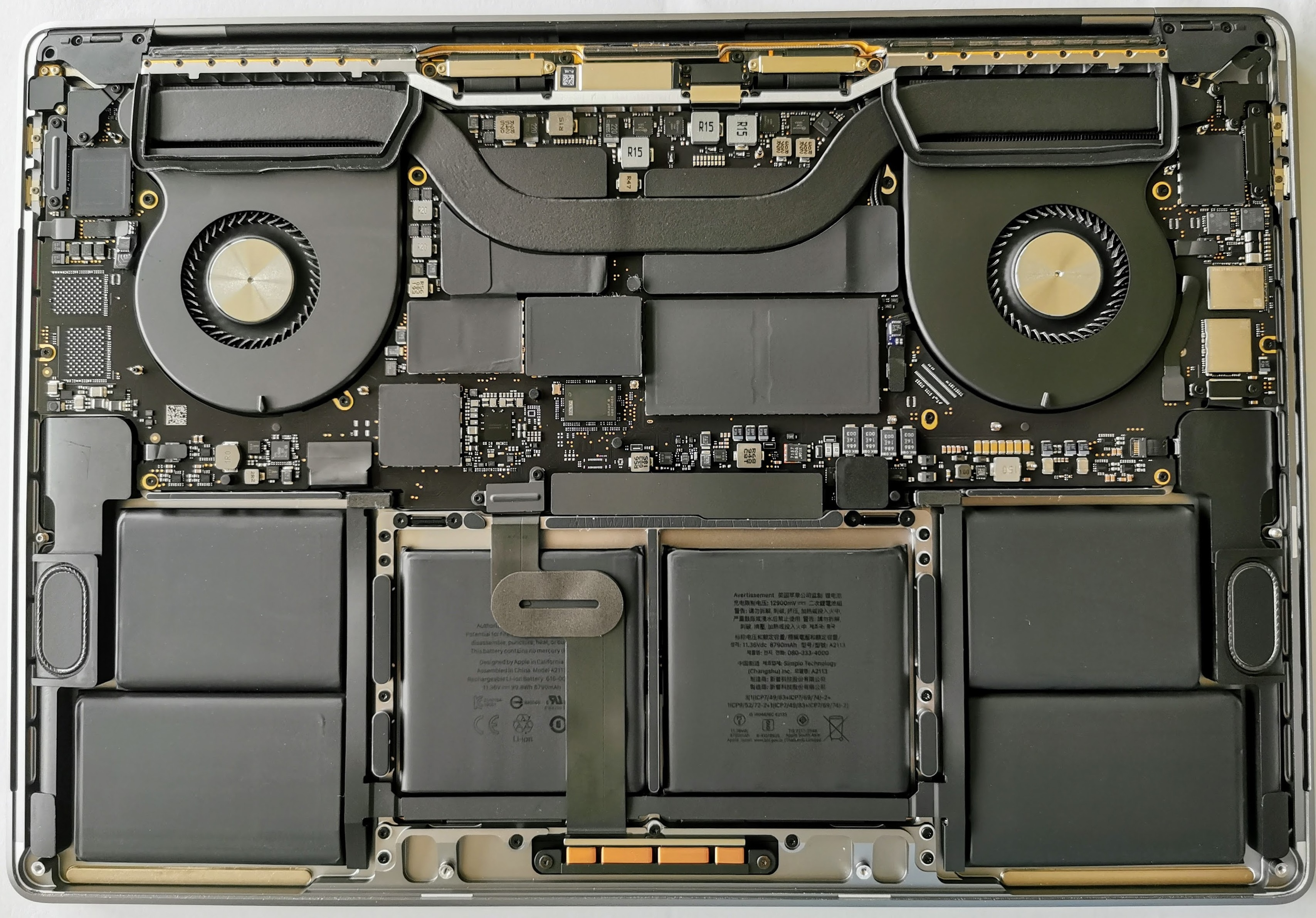
Teardown of a MacBook Pro (16-inch, 2019) showing internal parts

Apple unveiled Touch Bar 13- and 15-inch MacBook Pro models during a press event at their headquarters on October 27, 2016. All models, except for the baseline 13-inch model, featured the Touch Bar, a new multi-touch-enabled OLED strip built into the top of the keyboard in place of the function keys. The Touch Bar is abutted on its right by a sapphire-glass button that doubles as a Touch ID sensor and a power button. The models also introduced a "second-generation" butterfly-mechanism keyboard whose keys have more travel than the first iteration in the Retina MacBook. The 13-inch model has a trackpad that is 46% larger than its predecessor while the 15-inch model has a trackpad twice as large as the previous generation.

All ports have been replaced with either two or four combination Thunderbolt 3 ports that support USB-C 3.1 Gen 2 and dual DisplayPort 1.2 signals, any of which can be used for charging. The MacBook Pro is incompatible with some older Thunderbolt 3-certified peripherals, including Intel's own reference design for Thunderbolt 3 devices. Furthermore, macOS on MacBook Pro blacklists certain classes of Thunderbolt 3-compatible devices, preventing them from working. Support for Thunderbolt 3 external graphics processing units (eGPU) was added in macOS High Sierra 10.13.4. Devices using HDMI, previous-generation Thunderbolt, and USB need an adapter to connect to the MacBook Pro. The models come with a 3.5 mm headphone jack; the TOSLINK functionality of older-generation MacBook Pro computers has been removed.

Other updates to the MacBook Pro include dual- and quad-core Intel "Skylake" Core i5 and i7 processors, improved graphics, and displays that offer a 25% wider color gamut, 67% more brightness, and 67% more contrast. All versions can output to a 5K display; the 15-inch models can drive two such displays. The 15-inch models include a discrete Radeon Pro 450, 455 or 460 graphics card in addition to the integrated Intel graphics. The base 13-inch model has function keys instead of the Touch Bar, and just two USB-C ports. The flash storage in the Touch Bar models is soldered to the logic board and is not upgradeable, while in the 13-inch model without Touch Bar, it is removable, but difficult to replace, as it is a proprietary format of SSD storage.

On June 5, 2017, Apple updated the line with Intel Kaby Lake processors and newer graphics cards. A 128 GB (Note: 1 GB = 1 billion bytes. 1 TB = 1 trillion bytes) storage option was added for the base 13-inch model, down from the base 256 GB storage. New symbols were introduced to the control and option keys. On July 12, 2018, Apple updated the Touch Bar models with Intel Coffee Lake quad-core processors in 13-inch models and six-core processors in 15-inch models, updated graphics cards, third-generation butterfly keyboards that introduced new symbols for the control and option keys, Bluetooth 5, T2 SoC Chip, True Tone display technology, and larger-capacity batteries. The 15-inch model can also be configured with up to 4 TB of storage, 32 GB of DDR4 memory and a Core i9 processor. In late November the higher-end 15-inch model could be configured with Radeon Pro Vega graphics. On May 21, 2019, Apple announced updated Touch Bar models with newer processors, with an eight-core Core i9 standard for the higher-end 15-inch model, and an updated keyboard manufactured with "new materials" across the line. On July 9, 2019, Apple updated the 13-inch model with two Thunderbolt ports with newer quad-core eighth-generation processors and Intel Iris Plus graphics, True Tone display technology, and replaced the function keys with the Touch Bar. macOS Catalina added support for Dolby Atmos, Dolby Vision, and HDR10 on 2018 and newer models. macOS Catalina 10.15.2 added support for 6016x3384 output on 15-inch 2018 and newer models to run the Pro Display XDR at full resolution.

The 2019 MacBook Pro models (except the 16-inch model) is the last generation of MacBook Pro that natively supports macOS Mojave 10.14, which is the last macOS version that can run 32-bit applications such as Adobe Creative Suite 6 or Microsoft Office for Mac 2011.

=== Design and usability ===
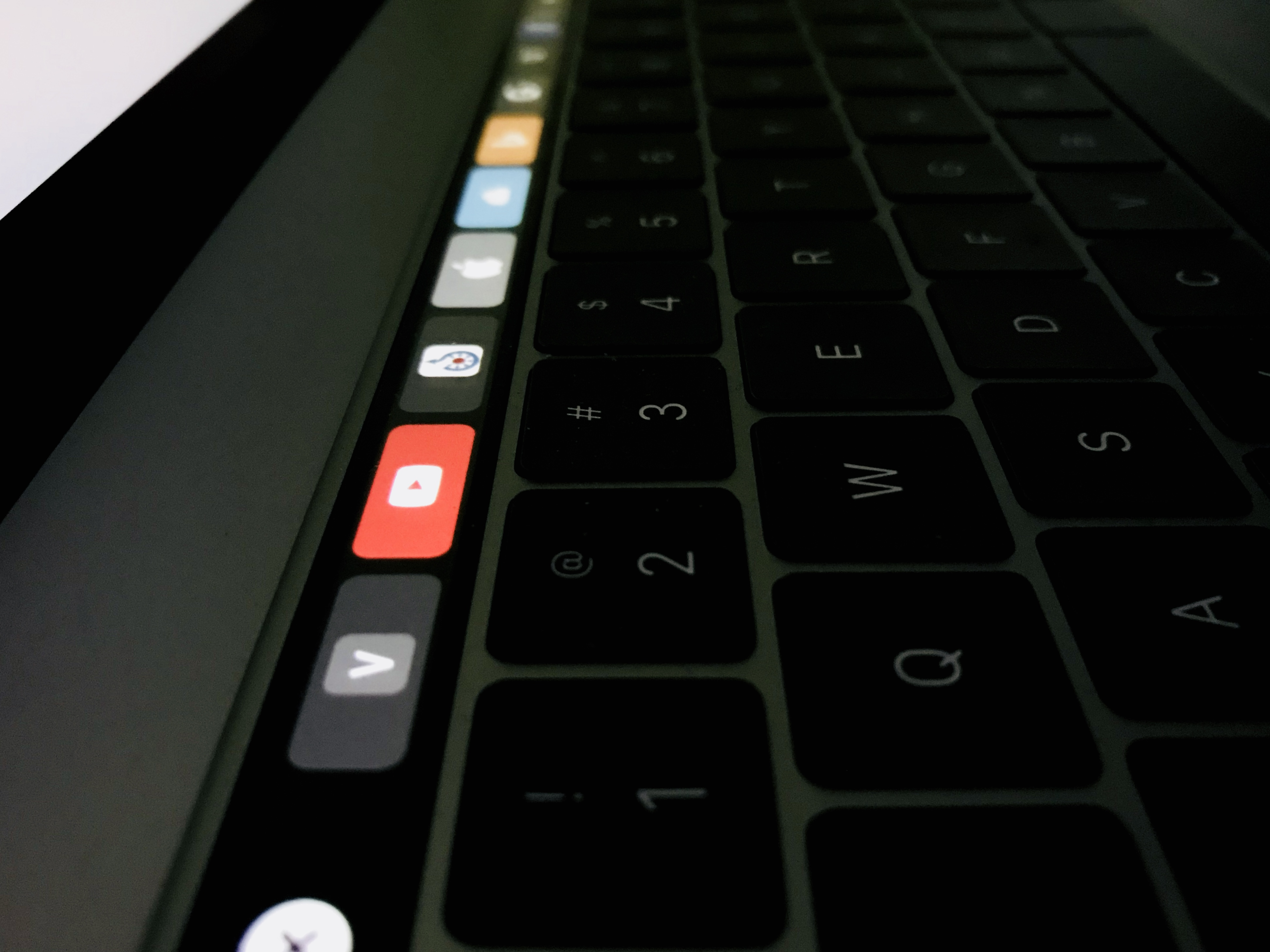
Touch Bar of MacBook Pro

The Touch Bar MacBook Pro follows the design of the Retina models, with an all-metal unibody enclosure and separated black keys. A few of the apparent design changes include a thinner chassis and screen bezel, a larger trackpad, the OLED Touch Bar, and the shallower butterfly-mechanism keyboard with less key separation than the previous models. The speaker grilles have been relocated to the sides of the keyboard on the 13-inch variant. Tear downs show that the speaker grilles on the 13-inch model with Touch Bar are "largely cosmetic", and that sound output mostly comes through the side vents. The Touch Bar MacBook Pro comes in two finishes, the traditional silver color and a darker "space gray" color. The MacBook Pro model name returns to the bottom of the screen bezel in Apple's San Francisco font after being absent from the Retina MacBook Pro. As with the Retina MacBook, the new models replace the backlit white Apple logo on the rear of the screen, a feature dating back to the 1999 PowerBook G3, with a glossy metal version.

MagSafe, a magnetic charging connector, has been replaced with USB-C charging. Unlike MagSafe, which provided an indicator light within the user's field of view to indicate the device's charging status, the USB-C charger has no visual indicator. Instead, the MacBook Pro emits a chime when connected to power. The Macintosh startup chime that has been used since the first Macintosh in 1984 is now disabled by default. The notebook now boots automatically when the lid is opened.

=== Battery life ===
The battery life of the new models also got a mixed reception, with outlets reporting inconsistent battery life and inaccurate estimates of time remaining on battery by the operating system. After the latter reports, Apple used a macOS update to hide the display of estimated battery time. Consumer Reports did not initially recommend the 2016 MacBook Pro models, citing inconsistent and unpredictable battery life in its lab testing (which involves the consecutive loading of multiple websites). However, Apple and Consumer Reports found that the results had been affected by a bug caused by disabling caching in Safari's developer tools. Consumer Reports performed the tests again with a patched macOS, and retracted its original assessment.

=== Repairability ===
iFixit scored the models 1 out of 10 for repairability, noting that memory, the processor, and flash storage are soldered to the logic board, while the battery is glued to the case. The entire assembly uses proprietary pentalobe screws and cannot be disassembled with standard tools.

=== Keyboard reliability ===
A report by AppleInsider has claimed that the updated "Butterfly" keyboard fails twice as often as previous models, often due to particles stuck beneath the keys. Repairs for stuck keys have been estimated to cost more than $700. In May 2018, two class action lawsuits were filed against Apple regarding the keyboard problem; one alleged a "constant threat of nonresponsive keys and accompanying keyboard failure" and accusing Apple of not alerting consumers to the problem. In June 2018, Apple announced a Service Program to "service eligible MacBook and MacBook Pro keyboards, free of charge". The 2018 models added a membrane underneath keys to prevent malfunction from dust. As of early 2019, there were reports of problems with the same type of keyboards in the 2018 MacBook Air. In May 2019, Apple modified the keyboard for the fourth time and promised that any MacBook keyboard with butterfly switches would be repaired or replaced free of charge for a period of four years after the date of sale.

=== Thermal throttling ===
PC Magazine said "the Core i9 processor Apple chose to use inside the MacBook Pro (i9-8950HK) has a base clock frequency of 2.9 GHz, which is capable of bursting up to 4.8 GHz when necessary. However, testing carried out by YouTuber Dave Lee showed that the Core i9 couldn't even maintain 2.9 GHz, let alone 4.8 GHz. And it ended up running at 2.2 GHz due to the heat generated inside the chassis forcing it to throttle. Lee found the 2018 i9 MacBook Pro was slower than the 2017 MacBook Pro and stated, "This isn't a problem with Intel's Core i9, it's Apple's thermal solution." When Lee put the i9 MacBook Pro inside a freezer, the render times were over 30% faster.

On July 24, 2018, Apple released a software fix for the new 2018 MacBook Pro computers which addressed the thermal throttling problem. Apple said "there is a missing digital key in the firmware that impacts the thermal management system and could drive clock speeds down under heavy thermal loads on the new MacBook Pro".

=== Other problems ===
A "limited number" of 13-inch MacBook Pro units without Touch Bar, manufactured between October 2016 and October 2017, saw the built-in battery swell. Apple created a free replacement program for eligible units.

A "limited number" of 128 and 256 GB solid-state drives used in 13-inch MacBook Pro (non-Touch Bar) units can lose data and fail. 13-inch MacBook Pro units with affected drives were sold between June 2017 and June 2018. This resulted in Apple launching a repair program for those affected – the repair involves the update of firmware.

Some users are reporting kernel panics on 2018 models, because of the T2 chip. Apple is already aware of the problem and performing an investigation. There are also user reports about the speaker crackling problems on the 2018 models.

Users have reported malfunctioning display cables, causing uneven lighting at the bottom of the screen and ultimately display failure. Customers of Apple have named this issue "Flexgate". The problem has been tracked to a cable, stressed from opening and closing the notebook. The entire display needs to be replaced in affected units. In May 2019 Apple initiated a program to replace the display on affected 13-inch models made in 2016 for free, and the cable on the 2018 models and onwards was made 2 mm longer than on prior models, thus reducing the likelihood of display failure. Apple has been criticized for not extending the replacement program to the 15-inch models which are also affected by this issue.

=== Reception ===
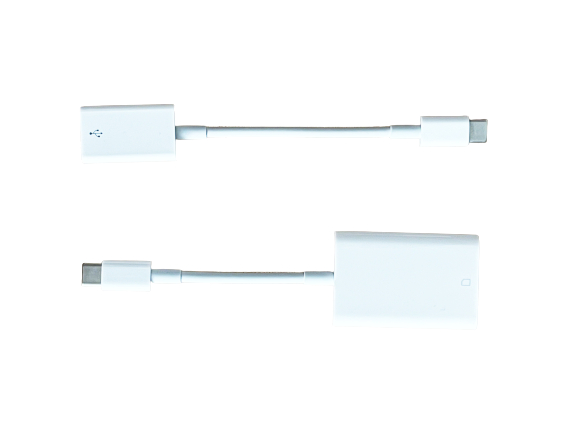
The MacBook Pro (2016) was criticized for needing adapters for USB or SD card connections.

The Touch Bar MacBook Pro received mixed reviews. The display, build quality, and audio quality were praised but many complained about the butterfly keyboard; the little-used Touch Bar; and the absence of USB-A ports, HDMI port, and SD card slot.

Ars Technica noted that the second-generation keyboard with firm keys was a "drastic departure" from previous Retina MacBook keyboards. It further noted that resting palms may brush the trackpad occasionally, causing inadvertent cursor jumps onscreen as the notebook interprets this as input, without one's hands or wrists actually resting on it. Bandwidth increased; the flash storage was about 40 percent faster. Engadget praised the thinner, lighter design; improved display and audio; and increased speed of the graphics and flash storage, but criticized the lack of ports and the price. Wired praised the display, calling it "the best laptop display I've ever seen", as well as praising the Touch Bar, though it criticized the need of adapters for many common connectors. Likewise, The Verge concluded that "using [the new MacBook] is alienating to anyone living in the present. I agree with Apple's vision of the future. I'm just not buying it today."

Engadget voiced their concerns that "by doing things like removing full-sized USB ports, the memory card reader and even the Function row, Apple seems to have forgotten how many of us actually work". Miriam Nielsen from The Verge said: "When I tried to intentionally use the Touch Bar, I felt like a kid learning how to type again. I had to keep looking down at the bar instead of looking at the images I was actually trying to edit." She also said that after learning the Touch Bar one cannot work as efficiently on any other computer. Developers have their share of headaches because they cannot rely on the Touch Bar being present on every machine that runs their software. Even if Apple makes the Touch Bar an integral part of macOS, it will take "many years" for it to become ubiquitous, in the meantime, anything in the Bar needs to be available through another part of the interface.

Also criticized were non-compatibility between Thunderbolt 2 and 3 devices. Some found unpleasant the fan whine on the 15" model, where the two integrated fans run all the time by default, thanks to the coprocessor powering the Touch Bar and higher TDP of the stronger CPU models.

In 2016 and 2017, the Touch Bar caused concern among American state bars that the predictive text could be used to cheat on bar exams. The responses varied state by state: New York State Bar Association banned the use of the MacBook Pro on bar exams; while North Carolina Bar Association allowed students to take the state bar exam with the computer once a proctor verified that the predictive text feature had been disabled.

=== Technical specifications ===
Obsolete	Vintage	Discontinued

Model			13-inch, 2016 Two Thunderbolt 3 Ports	13-inch, 2016 Four Thunderbolt 3 Ports		15-inch, 2016		13-inch, 2017 Two Thunderbolt 3 Ports		13-inch, 2017 Four Thunderbolt 3 Ports		15-inch, 2017		13-inch, 2018 Four Thunderbolt 3 Ports		15-inch, 2018		13-inch, 2019 Two Thunderbolt 3 Ports	13-inch, 2019 Four Thunderbolt 3 Ports		15-inch, 2019	
Initial release operating system			macOS 10.12 Sierra											macOS 10.13 High Sierra				macOS 10.14 Mojave				
Latest release operating system			macOS 12 Monterey					macOS 13 Ventura						macOS 15 Sequoia								
Display
Display	Screen Size		13.3 in (340 mm) (diagonal)			15.4 in (390 mm) (diagonal)		13.3 in (340 mm) (diagonal)				15.4 in (390 mm) (diagonal)		13.3 in (340 mm) (diagonal)		15.4 in (390 mm) (diagonal)		13.3 in (340 mm) (diagonal)			15.4 in (390 mm) (diagonal)	
Display	Backlight		Edge-lit LED-backlit																			
Display	Technology		Retina Display with IPS technology																			
Display	Resolution		2560 × 1600			2880 × 1800		2560 × 1600				2880 × 1800		2560 × 1600		2880 × 1800		2560 × 1600			2880 × 1800	
Display	Pixel density (ppi)		226			220		226				220		226		220		226			220	
Display	Aspect ratio		16:10																			
Display	Supported scaled resolutions		1680 × 1050 (rendered as 3360 × 2100); 1440 × 900 (rendered as 2880 × 1800, default); 1280 × 800 (rendered as 2560 × 1600, native); 1024 × 640 (rendered as 2048 × 1280)			1920 × 1200 (rendered as 3840 × 2400); 1680 × 1050 (rendered as 3360 × 2100, default); 1440 × 900 (rendered as 2880 × 1800, native); 1280 × 800 (rendered as 2560 × 1600); 1024 × 640 (rendered as 2048 × 1280)		1680 × 1050 (rendered as 3360 × 2100); 1440 × 900 (rendered as 2880 × 1800, default); 1280 × 800 (rendered as 2560 × 1600, native); 1024 × 640 (rendered as 2048 × 1280)				1920 × 1200 (rendered as 3840 × 2400); 1680 × 1050 (rendered as 3360 × 2100, default); 1440 × 900 (rendered as 2880 × 1800, native); 1280 × 800 (rendered as 2560 × 1600); 1024 × 640 (rendered as 2048 × 1280)		1680 × 1050 (rendered as 3360 × 2100); 1440 × 900 (rendered as 2880 × 1800, default); 1280 × 800 (rendered as 2560 × 1600, native); 1024 × 640 (rendered as 2048 × 1280)		1920 × 1200 (rendered as 3840 × 2400); 1680 × 1050 (rendered as 3360 × 2100, default); 1440 × 900 (rendered as 2880 × 1800, native); 1280 × 800 (rendered as 2560 × 1600); 1024 × 640 (rendered as 2048 × 1280)		1680 × 1050 (rendered as 3360 × 2100); 1440 × 900 (rendered as 2880 × 1800, default); 1280 × 800 (rendered as 2560 × 1600, native); 1024 × 640 (rendered as 2048 × 1280)			1920 × 1200 (rendered as 3840 × 2400); 1680 × 1050 (rendered as 3360 × 2100, default); 1440 × 900 (rendered as 2880 × 1800, native); 1280 × 800 (rendered as 2560 × 1600); 1024 × 640 (rendered as 2048 × 1280)	
Display	SDR max. brightness ( cd/m^{2})		500																			
Display	XDR max. brightness ( cd/m^{2})		—N/a																			
Display	Color depth		8-bits per channel (24-bits total; 16,777,216 colors) (native)																			
Display	Full sRGB display		Yes																			
Display	Wide color display (Display P3)		Yes																			
Display	True Tone display		No											Yes								
Display	Night Shift		Yes																			
Display	ProMotion display		No																			
Display	Fixed refresh rate		60 Hz																			
Cooling system			One fan blows air through a copper fin stack, which is connected to the processor via a copper heat pipe, copper heat sink, and thermal paste.	Two fans blow air through separate copper fin stacks, which are connected to the processor via a shared copper heat pipe, copper heat sink, and thermal paste.		Two fans blow air through separate copper fin stacks, which are connected to the processor and discrete GPU via a shared copper heat pipe, a copper heat sink for each chip, and thermal paste.		One fan blows air through a copper fin stack, which is connected to the processor via a copper heat pipe, copper heat sink, and thermal paste.		Two fans blow air through separate copper fin stacks, which are connected to the processor via a shared copper heat pipe, copper heat sink, and thermal paste.		Two fans blow air through separate copper fin stacks, which are connected to the processor and discrete GPU via a shared copper heat pipe, a copper heat sink for each chip, and thermal paste.		Two fans blow air through separate copper fin stacks, which are connected to the processor via a shared copper heat pipe, copper heat sink, and thermal paste.		Two fans blow air through separate copper fin stacks, which are connected to the processor and discrete GPU via a shared copper heat pipe, a copper heat sink for each chip, and thermal paste.		One fan blows air through a copper fin stack, which is connected to the processor via a copper heat pipe, copper heat sink, and thermal paste.	Two fans blow air through separate copper fin stacks, which are connected to the processor via a shared copper heat pipe, copper heat sink, and thermal paste.		Two fans blow air through separate copper fin stacks, which are connected to the processor and discrete GPU via a shared copper heat pipe, a copper heat sink for each chip, and thermal paste.	
Processor
Processor	Marketing name		Intel Core i5-6360U	Intel Core i5-6267U		Intel Core i7-6700HQ	Intel Core i7-6820HQ	Intel Core i5-7360U		Intel Core i5-7267U		Intel Core i7-7700HQ	Intel Core i7-7820HQ	Intel Core i5-8259U		Intel Core i7-8750H	Intel Core i7-8850H	Intel Core i5-8257U	Intel Core i5-8279U		Intel Core i7-9750H	Intel Core i9-9880H
Processor	Die		Skylake U GT3e			Skylake H GT2		Kaby Lake U GT3e				Kaby Lake H [GT2]		Coffee Lake U GT3e		Coffee Lake H [GT2]		Coffee Lake U GT3e			Coffee Lake H [GT2] Refresh	
Processor	Technology node		Intel 14 nm					Intel 14 nm +						Intel 14 nm ++								
Processor	CPU																					
Processor	CPU	Config	2 cores 4 threads			4 cores 8 threads		2 cores 4 threads				4 cores 8 threads				6 cores 12 threads		4 cores 8 threads			6 cores 12 threads	8 cores 16 threads
Processor	CPU	Clock speed	2.0 GHz base 3.1 GHz turbo	2.9 GHz base 3.3 GHz turbo		2.6 GHz base 3.5 GHz turbo	2.7 GHz base 3.6 GHz turbo	2.3 GHz base 3.6 GHz turbo		3.1 GHz base 3.5 GHz turbo		2.8 GHz base 3.8 GHz turbo	2.9 GHz base 3.9 GHz turbo	2.3 GHz base 3.8 GHz turbo		2.2 GHz base 4.1 GHz turbo	2.6 GHz base 4.3 GHz turbo	1.4 GHz base 3.9 GHz turbo	2.4 GHz base 4.1 GHz turbo		2.6 GHz base 4.5 GHz turbo	2.3 GHz base 4.8 GHz turbo
Processor	GPU																					
Processor	GPU	Marketing name	Intel Iris Graphics 540	Intel Iris; Graphics 550		Intel HD; Graphics 530		Intel Iris Plus; Graphics 640		Intel Iris Plus; Graphics 650		Intel HD; Graphics 630		Intel Iris Plus; Graphics 655		Intel UHD; Graphics 630		Intel Iris Plus; Graphics 645	Intel Iris Plus; Graphics 655		Intel UHD; Graphics 630	
Processor	GPU	Config	384:48:6			192:24:3		384:48:6				192:24:3		384:48:6		192:24:3		384:48:6			192:24:3	
Processor	GPU	Memory allocation	1536 MB																			
Processor	Shared caches																					
Processor	Shared caches	Last level cache	4 MB			6 MB	8 MB	4 MB				6 MB	8 MB	6 MB		9 MB		6 MB			12 MB	16 MB
Processor	Shared caches	eDRAM	64 MB			—N/a		64 MB				—N/a		128 MB		—N/a		128 MB			—N/a	
Processor	Online configuration		Intel Core i7-6660U with: 2-core, 4-thread CPU; 2.4 GHz Base Clock Speed; 3.4 GHz Turbo Clock Speed; 4 MB Last Level Cache	Intel Core i5-6287U with: 2-core, 4-thread CPU; 3.1 GHz Base Clock Speed; 3.5 GHz Turbo Clock Speed; 4 MB Last Level Cache, or; Intel Core i7-6567U with: 2-core, 4-thread CPU; 3.3 GHz Base Clock Speed; 3.6 GHz Turbo Clock Speed; 4 MB Last Level Cache		Intel Core i7-6920HQ with: 4-core, 8-thread CPU; 2.9 GHz Base Clock Speed; 3.8 GHz Turbo Clock Speed; 8 MB Last Level Cache		Intel Core i7-7600U with: 2-core, 4-thread CPU; 2.5 GHz Base Clock Speed; 4.0 GHz Turbo Clock Speed; 4 MB Last Level Cache		Intel Core i5-7287U with: 2-core, 4-thread CPU; 3.3 GHz Base Clock Speed; 3.7 GHz Turbo Clock Speed; 4 MB Last Level Cache, or; Intel Core i7-7567U with: 2-core, 4-thread CPU; 3.5 GHz Base Clock Speed; 4.0 GHz Turbo Clock Speed; 4 MB Last Level Cache		Intel Core i7-7920HQ with: 4-core, 8-thread CPU; 3.1 GHz Base Clock Speed; 4.1 GHz Turbo Clock Speed; 8 MB Last Level Cache		Intel Core i7-8559U with: 4-core, 8-thread CPU; 2.7 GHz Base Clock Speed; 4.5 GHz Turbo Clock Speed; 8 MB Last Level Cache		Intel Core i9-8950HK with: 6-core, 12-thread CPU; 2.9 GHz Base Clock Speed; 4.8 GHz Turbo Clock Speed; 12 MB Last Level Cache		Intel Core i7-8557U with: 4-core, 8-thread CPU; 1.7 GHz Base Clock Speed; 4.5 GHz Turbo Clock Speed; 8 MB Last Level Cache	Intel Core i7-8569U with: 4-core, 8-thread CPU; 2.8 GHz Base Clock Speed; 4.7 GHz Turbo Clock Speed; 8 MB Last Level Cache		Intel Core i9-9980HK with: 8-core, 16-thread CPU; 2.4 GHz Base Clock Speed; 5.0 GHz Turbo Clock Speed; 16 MB Last Level Cache	
Processor	Memory																					
Processor	Memory	Type	LPDDR3-1866 128-bit (29.856 GB/s)	LPDDR3-2133 128-bit (34.128 GB/s)												DDR4-2400 128-bit (38.4 GB/s)		LPDDR3-2133 128-bit (34.128 GB/s)			DDR4-2400 128-bit (38.4 GB/s)	
Processor	Memory	Capacity	8 GB			16 GB		8 GB				16 GB		8 GB		16 GB		8 GB			16 GB	
Processor	Memory	Online configuration	16 GB			—N/a		16 GB				—N/a		16 GB		32 GB		16 GB			32 GB	
Discrete GPU
Discrete GPU	Chip		—N/a			AMD Radeon Pro 450	AMD Radeon Pro 455	—N/a				AMD Radeon Pro 555	AMD Radeon Pro 560	—N/a		AMD Radeon Pro 555X	AMD Radeon Pro 560X	—N/a			AMD Radeon Pro 555X	AMD Radeon Pro 560X
Discrete GPU	Config		—N/a			640:40:16; 10 CU	768:48:16; 12 CU	—N/a				768:48:16; 12 CU	1024:64:16; 16 CU	—N/a		768:48:16; 12 CU	1024:64:16; 16 CU	—N/a			768:48:16; 12 CU	1024:64:16; 16 CU
Discrete GPU	Memory type		—N/a			128-bit GDDR5-5000 (80 GB/s)		—N/a				128-bit GDDR5-5100 (81.6 GB/s)		—N/a		128-bit GDDR5-5900 (94.4 GB/s)		—N/a			128-bit GDDR5-5900 (94.4 GB/s)	
Discrete GPU	Memory capacity		—N/a			2 GB		—N/a				2 GB	4 GB	—N/a		4 GB		—N/a			4 GB	
Discrete GPU	Automatic graphics switching		—N/a			Yes		—N/a				Yes		—N/a		Yes		—N/a			Yes	
Discrete GPU	Online configuration		—N/a			AMD Radeon Pro 460 (1024:64:16; 16 CU) with 4 GB memory (128-bit GDDR5-5000; 80 GB/s) and automatic graphics switching		—N/a				AMD Radeon Pro 560 (1024:64:16; 16 CU) with 4 GB memory (128-bit GDDR5-5100; 81.6 GB/s) and automatic graphics switching		—N/a		AMD Radeon Pro 560X (1024:64:16; 16 CU) with 4 GB memory (128-bit GDDR5-5900; 94.4 GB/s) and automatic graphics switching	AMD Radeon Pro 560X (1024:64:16; 16 CU) with 4 GB memory (128-bit GDDR5-5900; 94.4 GB/s) and automatic graphics switching; AMD Radeon Pro Vega 16 (1024:64:32; 16 CU) with 4 GB memory (1024-bit HBM2-2400) and automatic graphics switching; AMD Radeon Pro Vega 20 (1280:80:32; 20 CU) with 4 GB memory (1024-bit HBM2-1480) and automatic graphics switching	—N/a			AMD Radeon Pro 560X (1024:64:16; 16 CU) with 4 GB memory (128-bit GDDR5-5900; 94.4 GB/s) and automatic graphics switching	AMD Radeon Pro 560X (1024:64:16; 16 CU) with 4 GB memory (128-bit GDDR5-5900; 94.4 GB/s) and automatic graphics switching; AMD Radeon Pro Vega 16 (1024:64:32; 16 CU) with 4 GB memory (1024-bit HBM2-2400) and automatic graphics switching; AMD Radeon Pro Vega 20 (1280:80:32; 20 CU) with 4 GB memory (1024-bit HBM2-1480) and automatic graphics switching
SSD
SSD	Type		TLC NAND flash connected via a PCIe 3.0 x4 interface																			
SSD	Capacity		256 GB		512 GB	256 GB	512 GB	128 GB	256 GB		512 GB	256 GB	512 GB	256 GB	512 GB	256 GB	512 GB	128 GB	256 GB	512 GB	256 GB	512 GB
SSD	Online configuration		512 GB; 1 TB	—N/a	1 TB	512 GB; 1 TB; 2 TB	1 TB; 2 TB	256 GB; 512 GB; 1 TB	512 GB; 1 TB		1 TB	512 GB; 1 TB; 2 TB	1 TB; 2 TB	512 GB; 1 TB; 2 TB	1 TB; 2 TB	512 GB; 1 TB; 2 TB; 4 TB	1 TB; 2 TB; 4 TB	256; 512 GB; 1 TB; 2 TB	512 GB; 1 TB; 2 TB	1 TB; 2 TB	512 GB; 1 TB; 2 TB; 4 TB	1 TB; 2 TB; 4 TB
Keyboard and trackpad
Keyboard and trackpad	Type		Backlit keyboard with 2nd generation butterfly mechanism and ambient light sensor											Backlit keyboard with 3rd generation butterfly mechanism and ambient light sensor				Backlit keyboard with 4th generation butterfly mechanism and ambient light sensor				
Keyboard and trackpad	Number of keys		78 (U.S.) or 79 (ISO)	65 (U.S.) or 66 (ISO)				78 (U.S.) or 79 (ISO)		65 (U.S.) or 66 (ISO)												
Keyboard and trackpad	Arrow keys		4 arrow keys																			
Keyboard and trackpad	Function keys		Yes	No				Yes		No												
Keyboard and trackpad	Touch Bar		No	Yes				No		Yes												
Keyboard and trackpad	Trackpad		Force Touch Trackpad																			
Secure authentication
Secure authentication	Touch ID		No	Integrated in power button				No		Integrated in power button												
Secure authentication	Security chip		—N/a	Apple T1				—N/a		Apple T1				Apple T2								
Audio
Audio	Speakers		Stereo speakers with high dynamic range																			
Audio	Force-cancelling woofers		No																			
Audio	Wide stereo sound		No																			
Audio	Dolby Atmos playback		No											Yes								
Audio	Dolby Atmos with built-in speakers		No																			
Audio	Spatial Audio with dynamic head tracking		No																			
Audio	Microphone		Two-mic array	Three-mic array				Two-mic array		Three-mic array												
Audio	3.5mm headphone jack		Yes																			
Audio	Audio output from HDMI		No																			
Camera
Camera	Resolution		720p FaceTime HD																			
Connectivity
Connectivity	Wi-Fi (802.11)		Wi-Fi 5 (802.11a/b/g/n/ac) (0.866 Gbit/s (?))																			
Connectivity	Bluetooth		Bluetooth 4.2											Bluetooth 5.0								
Connectivity	HDMI port		No																			
Connectivity	SDXC card slot		No																			
Connectivity	Thunderbolt ports		Two Thunderbolt 3 (USB-C) ports, connected via a shared PCIe 3.0 x4 interface, with support for: Charging, DisplayPort, Thunderbolt (up to 5 GB/s), USB 3.1 Gen 2 (up to 1.21… GB/s)	Four Thunderbolt 3 (USB-C) ports, connected via a shared PCIe 3.0 x4 (left-side) or x2 (right-side) interface, with support for: Charging, DisplayPort, Thunderbolt (up to 5 GB/s), USB 3.1 Gen 2 (up to 1.21… GB/s)		Four Thunderbolt 3 (USB-C) ports, connected via two shared PCIe 3.0 x4 interfaces (one interface for each side), with support for: Charging, DisplayPort, Thunderbolt (up to 5 GB/s), USB 3.1 Gen 2 (up to 1.21… GB/s)		Two Thunderbolt 3 (USB-C) ports, connected via a shared PCIe 3.0 x4 interface, with support for: Charging, DisplayPort, Thunderbolt (up to 5 GB/s), USB 3.1 Gen 2 (up to 1.21… GB/s)		Four Thunderbolt 3 (USB-C) ports, connected via a shared PCIe 3.0 x4 (left-side) or x2 (right-side) interface, with support for: Charging, DisplayPort, Thunderbolt (up to 5 GB/s), USB 3.1 Gen 2 (up to 1.21… GB/s)		Four Thunderbolt 3 (USB-C) ports, connected via two shared PCIe 3.0 x4 interfaces (one interface for each side), with support for: Charging, DisplayPort, Thunderbolt (up to 5 GB/s), USB 3.1 Gen 2 (up to 1.21… GB/s)		Four Thunderbolt 3 (USB-C) ports, connected via two shared PCIe 3.0 x4 interfaces (one interface for each side), with support for: Charging, DisplayPort, Thunderbolt (up to 5 GB/s), USB 3.1 Gen 2 (up to 1.21… GB/s)				Two Thunderbolt 3 (USB-C) ports, connected via a shared PCIe 3.0 x4 interface, with support for: Charging, DisplayPort, Thunderbolt (up to 5 GB/s), USB 3.1 Gen 2 (up to 1.21… GB/s)	Four Thunderbolt 3 (USB-C) ports, connected via two shared PCIe 3.0 x4 interfaces (one interface for each side), with support for: Charging, DisplayPort, Thunderbolt (up to 5 GB/s), USB 3.1 Gen 2 (up to 1.21… GB/s)			
Connectivity	eGPU support		Yes																			
Connectivity	External display support																					
Connectivity	External display support	Maximum number of displays	2			4		2				4		2		4		2			4	
Connectivity	External display support	Maximum one display configuration	5120x2880 at 60Hz with 10-bits per channel			—N/a		5120x2880 at 60Hz with 10-bits per channel				—N/a		5120x2880 at 60Hz with 10-bits per channel		—N/a		5120x2880 at 60Hz with 10-bits per channel			—N/a	
Connectivity	External display support	Maximum two display configuration(s)	x2 4096x2304 at 60Hz with 8-bits per channel; x2 3840x2160 at 60Hz with 10-bits per channel			x2 5120x2880 at 60Hz with 10-bits per channel		x2 4096x2304 at 60Hz with 8-bits per channel; x2 3840x2160 at 60Hz with 10-bits per channel				x2 5120x2880 at 60Hz with 10-bits per channel		x2 4096x2304 at 60Hz with 8-bits per channel; x2 3840x2160 at 60Hz with 10-bits per channel		x2 5120x2880 at 60Hz with 10-bits per channel		x2 4096x2304 at 60Hz with 8-bits per channel; x2 3840x2160 at 60Hz with 10-bits per channel			x2 5120x2880 at 60Hz with 10-bits per channel	
Connectivity	External display support	Maximum four display configuration(s)	—N/a			x4 4096x2304 at 60Hz with 8-bits per channel; x4 3840x2160 at 60Hz with 10-bits per channel		—N/a				x4 4096x2304 at 60Hz with 8-bits per channel; x4 3840x2160 at 60Hz with 10-bits per channel		—N/a		x4 4096x2304 at 60Hz with 8-bits per channel; x4 3840x2160 at 60Hz with 10-bits per channel		—N/a			x4 4096x2304 at 60Hz with 8-bits per channel; x4 3840x2160 at 60Hz with 10-bits per channel	
Power
Power	Battery		11.40 V 54.5 W·h (4781 mA·h)	11.41 V 49.2 W·h (4314 mA·h)		11.40 V 76.0 W·h (6667 mA·h)		11.40 V 54.5 W·h (4781 mA·h)		11.41 V 49.2 W·h (4314 mA·h)		11.40 V 76.0 W·h (6667 mA·h)		11.41 V 58.0 W·h (5086 mA·h)		11.40 V 83.6 W·h (7336 mA·h)		11.41 V 58.2 W·h (5103 mA·h)	11.41 V 58.0 W·h (5086 mA·h)		11.40 V 83.6 W·h (7336 mA·h)	
Power	Power adapter		61 W USB-C			87 W USB-C		61 W USB-C				87 W USB-C		61 W USB-C		87 W USB-C		61 W USB-C			87 W USB-C	
Power	Charging method		Any Thunderbolt 3 port																			
Dimensions
Dimensions	Height		0.59 in (1.5 cm)			0.61 in (1.5 cm)		0.59 in (1.5 cm)				0.61 in (1.5 cm)		0.59 in (1.5 cm)		0.61 in (1.5 cm)		0.59 in (1.5 cm)			0.61 in (1.5 cm)	
Dimensions	Width		11.97 in (30.4 cm)			13.75 in (34.9 cm)		11.97 in (30.4 cm)				13.75 in (34.9 cm)		11.97 in (30.4 cm)		13.75 in (34.9 cm)		11.97 in (30.4 cm)			13.75 in (34.9 cm)	
Dimensions	Depth		8.36 in (21.2 cm)			9.48 in (24.1 cm)		8.36 in (21.2 cm)				9.48 in (24.1 cm)		8.36 in (21.2 cm)		9.48 in (24.1 cm)		8.36 in (21.2 cm)			9.48 in (24.1 cm)	
Dimensions	Weight		3.02 lb (1.37 kg)			4.02 lb (1.82 kg)		3.02 lb (1.37 kg)				4.02 lb (1.82 kg)		3.02 lb (1.37 kg)		4.02 lb (1.82 kg)		3.02 lb (1.37 kg)			4.02 lb (1.82 kg)	
Total greenhouse gas emissions			321 kg CO_{2}e (256 GB storage)	344 kg CO_{2}e (256 GB storage)		461 kg CO_{2}e (256 GB storage)		302 kg CO_{2}e (128 GB storage)	319 kg CO_{2}e (256 GB storage)	336 kg CO_{2}e (256 GB storage)		449 kg CO_{2}e (256 GB storage)		273 kg CO_{2}e (256 GB storage)		366 kg CO_{2}e (6-core CPU, 256 GB storage)		210 kg CO_{2}e (128 GB storage)	247 kg CO_{2}e (256 GB storage)		334 kg CO_{2}e (6-core CPU, 256 GB storage)	354 kg CO_{2}e (8-core CPU, 512 GB storage)
Model details
Model details	Model number		A1708	A1706		A1707		A1708		A1706		A1707		A1989		A1990		A2159	A1989		A1990	
Model details	Hardware strings		MacBookPro13,1	MacBookPro13,2		MacBookPro13,3		MacBookPro14,1		MacBookPro14,2		MacBookPro14,3		MacBookPro15,2		MacBookPro15,1		MacBookPro15,4	MacBookPro15,2		MacBookPro15,1 / MacBookPro15,3	
Model details	Part/order number		MLL42xx/A, MLUQ2xx/A	MLH12xx/A, MLVP2xx/A, MNQF2xx/A, MNQG2xx/A, MPDK2xx/A, MPDL2xx/A		MLH32xx/A, MLH42xx/A, MLH52xx/A, MLW72xx/A, MLW82xx/A, MLW92xx/A		MPXQ2xx/A, MPXR2xx/A, MPXT2xx/A, MPXU2xx/A		MPXV2xx/A, MPXW2xx/A, MPXX2xx/A, MPXY2xx/A, MQ002xx/A, MQ012xx/A		MPTR2xx/A, MPTT2xx/A, MPTU2xx/A, MPTV2xx/A, MPTW2xx/A, MPTX2xx/A		MR9Q2xx/A, MR9R2xx/A, MR9T2xx/A, MR9U2xx/A, MR9V2xx/A		MR932xx/A, MR942xx/A, MR952xx/A, MR962xx/A, MR972xx/A, MUQH2xx/A		MUHN2xx/A, MUHP2xx/a, MUHQ2xx/A, MUHR2xx/A, MUHR2xx/B	MV962xx/A, MV972xx/A, MV982xx/A, MV992xx/A, MV9A2xx/A		MV902xx/A, MV912xx/A, MV922xx/A, MV932xx/A, MV942xx/A, MV952xx/A	
Model details	MSRP(USD)		$1499	$1799	$1999	$2399	$2799	$1299	$1499	$1799	$1999	$2399	$2799	$1799	$1999	$2399	$2799	$1299	$1799	$1999	$2399	$2799
Timeline
Timeline	Date announced		October 27, 2016					June 5, 2017						July 12, 2018				July 9, 2019	May 21, 2019			
Timeline	Date released		October 27, 2016	November 12, 2016				June 5, 2017						July 12, 2018				July 9, 2019	May 21, 2019			
Timeline	Date discontinued		June 5, 2017					July 9, 2019		July 12, 2018				May 21, 2019				May 4, 2020			November 13, 2019	
Timeline	Date unsupported		July 29, 2024					August 20, 2025						Security fixes only								

=== Magic Keyboard revision ===
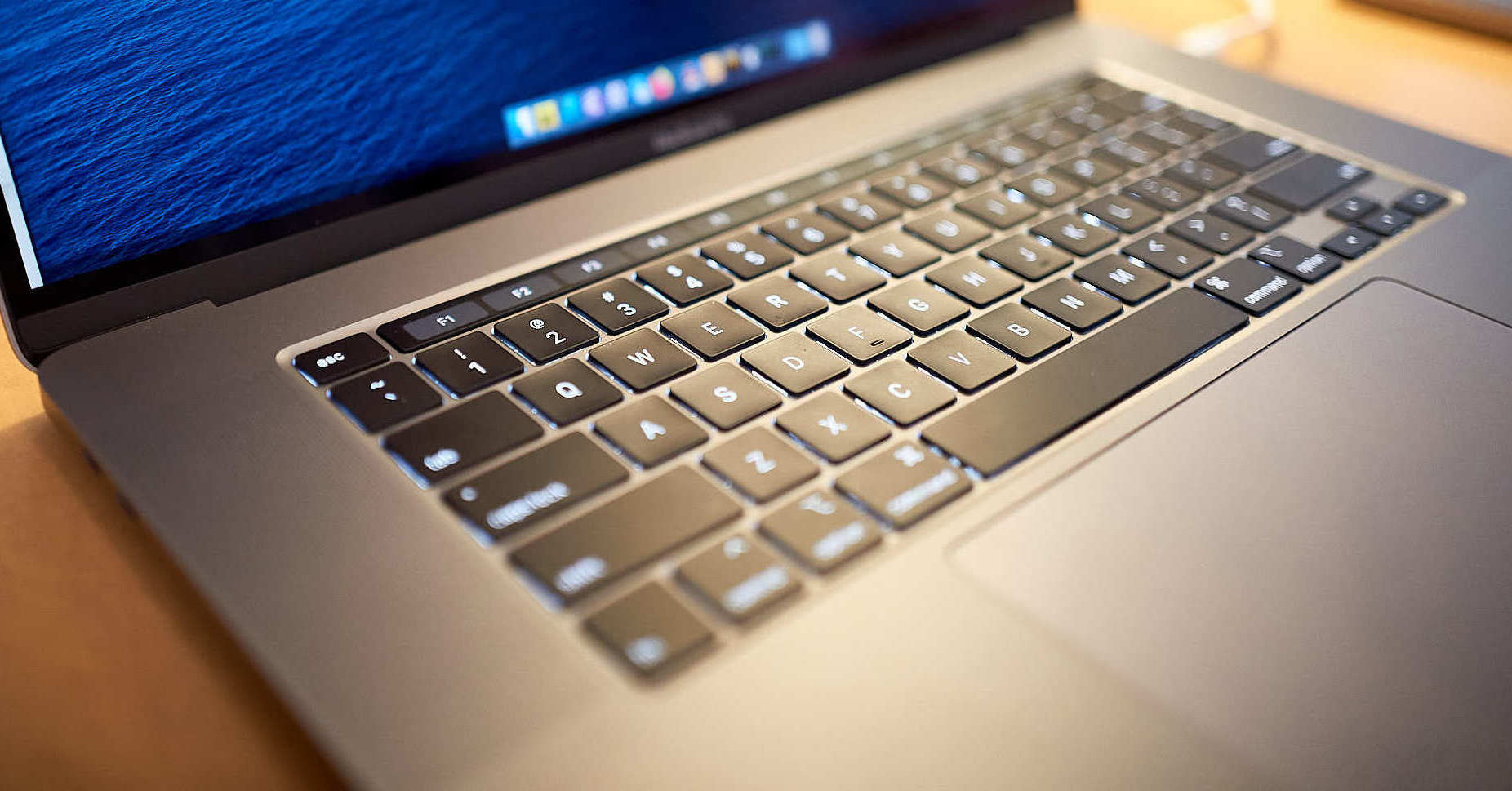
A MacBook Pro (16-inch, 2019)

Apple announced the 16-inch MacBook Pro on November 13, 2019, replacing the 15-inch model. Similar in size to the 15-inch model, it has a larger 16-inch 3072x1920 Retina display set in a narrower bezel, the largest MacBook screen since the 17-inch unibody MacBook Pro that was discontinued in 2012. It has a physical Escape key, a Touch Bar, and a now-separate sapphire-glass-covered Touch ID sensor at the right end of the Touch Bar that doubles as a power button. It uses a scissor mechanism keyboard almost identical to Apple's wireless Magic Keyboard, providing more travel than the previous revision's "Butterfly" keyboard.

Like its predecessor, the 16-inch MacBook Pro has four combined Thunderbolt 3 ports that support USB-C 3.1 Gen 2 and dual DisplayPort 1.4 signals, providing 6016×3384 output to run the Pro Display XDR at full resolution. Any port can be used for charging, it includes a 96 W USB-C power adapter. At launch only the included adapter and the Pro Display XDR provide full host power. Peripherals that delivered 87 W for the 15-inch model, such as LG Ultrafine displays, are recommended to be used with a separate power supply. It also has a 3.5 mm headphone jack.

It uses the same Coffee Lake CPUs as the 2019 15-inch model. Purchasers can choose between AMD Radeon Pro 5300M or 5500M GPUs with up to 8 GB of GDDR6 memory (or from June 2020 onwards, a 5600M GPU with 8 GB of HBM2 memory), up to 64 GB of 2667 MHz DDR4 memory, and up to 8 TB of SSD storage. It includes better speakers, a better three-microphone array, and a 100 Wh battery, the largest that can be easily carried onto a commercial airliner under U.S. Transportation Security Administration rules.

On May 4, 2020, Apple announced an updated 13-inch model with the Magic Keyboard. The four Thunderbolt port version comes with Ice Lake processors, updated graphics, up to 32 GB of memory and 4 TB of storage, and supports 6K output to run the Pro Display XDR. The two Thunderbolt port version has the same Coffee Lake processors, graphics, and maximum storage and memory as the 2019 two Thunderbolt port models. The 2020 13-inch models also gain 0.02 inches (0.6 mm) in thickness over the 2019 models.

==== Reception ====
Reception to the 16-inch MacBook Pro was generally positive. LaptopMag called the keyboard "much-improved". The Verge praised the new keyboard, microphones, and speakers, but criticized the lack of peripherals such as an SD card slot. 9to5Mac criticized the use of a 720p webcam and older 802.11ac Wi-Fi standard, noting that Apple's iPhone 11 family included a 4K front-facing camera and faster Wi-Fi 6. MacWorld also noted the lack of Face ID. Another review criticized the 13-inch model with two Thunderbolt 3 ports for being unable to run Apple's Pro Display XDR at full resolution, while the lower-priced 2020 MacBook Air, released two months earlier, can.

There are numerous reports of cracked screens caused by closing the unit with a third-party physical webcam cover due to reduced clearance compared to previous models.

==== Technical specifications ====
Model			16-inch, 2019		13-inch, 2020 Two Thunderbolt 3 Ports	13-inch, 2020 Four Thunderbolt 3 Ports
Initial release operating system			macOS 10.15 Catalina			
Latest release operating system			macOS 26 Tahoe		macOS 15 Sequoia	macOS 26 Tahoe
Display
Display	Screen Size		16 in (410 mm) (diagonal)		13.3 in (340 mm) (diagonal)	
Display	Backlight		LED-backlit			
Display	Technology		Retina Display with IPS technology			
Display	Resolution		3072 × 1920		2560 × 1600	
Display	Pixel Density (ppi)		226		227	
Display	Aspect Ratio		16:10			
Display	Supported scaled resolutions		2048 × 1280 (Rendered as 4096 × 2560); 1792 × 1120 (Rendered as 3584 × 2240, default); 1536 × 960 (Rendered as 3072 × 1920, native); 1334 × 840 (Rendered as 2668 × 1680); 1152 × 720 (Rendered as 2304 × 1440)		1680 × 1050 (Rendered as 3360 × 2100); 1440 × 900 (Rendered as 2880 × 1800, default); 1280 × 800 (Rendered as 2560 × 1600, native); 1024 × 640 (Rendered as 2048 × 1280)	
Display	SDR Max brightness ( cd/m^{2})		500			
Display	XDR Max brightness ( cd/m^{2})		—N/a			
Display	Color Depth		8-bit (native) with millions of colors			
Display	Full sRGB Display		Yes			
Display	Wide Color Display (Display P3)		Yes			
Display	True Tone Display		Yes			
Display	Night Shift		Yes			
Display	ProMotion Display		No			
Display	Fixed refresh rates		47.95 Hz, 48 Hz, 50 Hz, 59.95 Hz, 60 Hz		60 Hz	
Cooling System			Dual-fan cooling system with aluminum heat spreader attached on processor		Single-fan cooling system with aluminum heat spreader attached on processor	Dual-fan cooling system with aluminum heat spreader attached on processor
Processor
Processor	Chip		9th-generation Intel Core i7 9750H	9th-generation Intel Core i9 9880H	8th-generation Intel Core i5 8257U	10th-generation Intel Core i5 1038NG7
Processor	Codename		Coffee Lake			Ice Lake
Processor	Technology Node		14 nm			10 nm
Processor	CPU					
Processor	CPU	Total Cores	6	8	4	
Processor	CPU	Total Threads	12	16	8	
Processor	CPU	Base Clock Speed	2.6 GHz	2.3 GHz	1.4 GHz	2.0 GHz
Processor	CPU	Turbo Clock Speed	4.5 GHz	4.8 GHz	3.9 GHz	3.8 GHz
Processor	CPU	L3 Cache	12 MB	16 MB	6 MB	
Processor	CPU	Bus Speed	8 GT/s		4 GT/s	
Processor	CPU	Online Configuration	9th-generation Intel Core i9 9980HK with: 8-core CPU with 16 threads; 2.4 GHz Base Clock Speed; 5.0 GHz Turbo Clock Speed; 16 MB L3 Cache		8th-generation Intel Core i7 8557U with: 4-core CPU with 8 threads; 1.7 GHz Base Clock Speed; 4.5 GHz Turbo Clock Speed; 8 MB L3 Cache	10th-generation Intel Core i7 1068NG7 with: 4-core CPU with 8 threads; 2.3 GHz Base Clock Speed; 4.1 GHz Turbo Clock Speed; 8 MB L3 Cache
Graphics
Graphics	Integrated					
Graphics	Integrated	Name	Intel UHD Graphics 630		Intel Iris Plus Graphics 645	Intel Iris Plus Graphics
Graphics	Integrated	Tier	GT2		GT3e	G7
Graphics	Integrated	EUs and Shading units	24 (192)		48 (384)	64 (512)
Graphics	Integrated	Shared Memory	1536 MB			
Graphics	Integrated	eDRAM	—N/a		128 MB	—N/a
Graphics	Discrete					
Graphics	Discrete	Chip	AMD Radeon Pro 5300M	AMD Radeon Pro 5500M	—N/a	
Graphics	Discrete	Cores	1280	1536	—N/a	
Graphics	Discrete	Memory Type	128-bit GDDR6 (192 GB/s)		—N/a	
Graphics	Discrete	Memory Capacity	4 GB		—N/a	
Graphics	Discrete	Automatic Graphics Switching	Yes		—N/a	
Graphics	Discrete	Online Configuration	AMD Radeon Pro 5500M with 4 GB GDDR6 (From 5300M); AMD Radeon Pro 5500M with 8 GB GDDR6; AMD Radeon Pro 5600M with 8 GB HBM2(2560 Cores, 2048-bit HBM2, 384 GB/s, June 2020 until October 2021)		—N/a	
Memory
Memory	Type		DDR4 2666 MHz		LPDDR3 2133 MHz	LPDDR4X 3733 MHz
Memory	Capacity		16 GB		8 GB	16 GB
Memory	Online Configuration		32 GB; 64 GB		16 GB	32 GB
SSD
SSD	Type		PCIe 3.0-based SSD			
SSD	Capacity		512 GB	1 TB	256 GB	512 GB
SSD	Online Configuration		1 TB; 2 TB; 4 TB; 8 TB	2 TB; 4 TB; 8 TB	512 GB; 1 TB; 2 TB	1 TB; 2 TB; 4 TB
Keyboard and Trackpad
Keyboard and Trackpad	Type		Backlit Magic Keyboard with (Scissor-switch) mechanism and ambient light sensor			
Keyboard and Trackpad	Number of keys		65 (U.S.) or 66 (ISO)			
Keyboard and Trackpad	Arrow keys		4 arrow keys in an inverted-T arrangement			
Keyboard and Trackpad	Function keys		Esc key is physical only			
Keyboard and Trackpad	Touch Bar		Yes			
Keyboard and Trackpad	Trackpad		Force Touch Trackpad			
Secure Authentication
Secure Authentication	Touch ID		Yes			
Secure Authentication	Security Chip		Apple T2			
Audio
Audio	Speakers		High-fidelity six-speakers		Stereo speakers with high dynamic range	
Audio	Force-cancelling woofers		Yes		No	
Audio	Wide Stereo Sound		Yes			
Audio	Dolby Atmos Playback		Yes			
Audio	Dolby Atmos with built-in speakers		No			
Audio	Spatial Audio with dynamic head tracking		No			
Audio	Microphone		Studio-quality three-mic array with high signal-to-noise ratio and directional beamforming		Three-mic array with directional beamforming	
Audio	3.5 mm Jack		Yes			
Audio	Audio output from HDMI		No			
Camera
Camera	Resolution		720p FaceTime HD			
Connectivity
Connectivity	Wi-Fi (802.11)		Wi-Fi 5 (802.11a/b/g/n/ac)			
Connectivity	Maximum Wi-Fi Speed		0.866 Gbit/s			
Connectivity	Bluetooth		Bluetooth 5.0			
Connectivity	HDMI Port		No			
Connectivity	SDXC Card Slot		No			
Connectivity	USB-C/Thunderbolt Port		Four Thunderbolt 3 USB-C port supporting charging and DisplayPort protocols among others		Two Thunderbolt 3 USB-C port supporting charging and DisplayPort protocols among others	Four Thunderbolt 3 USB-C port supporting charging and DisplayPort protocols among others
Connectivity	Transmission Speed		Up to 40 Gbit/s transmission speed (Thunderbolt 3); Up to 10 Gbit/s transmission speed (USB 3.1 Gen 2)			
Connectivity	eGPU support		Yes			
Connectivity	External Display support					
Connectivity	External Display support	Maximum display	4		2	
Connectivity	External Display support	Max. one display combination	—N/a		5K at 60Hz at 10-bit	6K at 60Hz at 10-bit, or; 5K at 60Hz at 10-bit
Connectivity	External Display support	Max two displays combination	2 × 6K at 60Hz at 10-bit		2 × 4K UHD at 60Hz at 10-bit, or; 2 × 4K DCI at 60Hz at 8-bit	
Connectivity	External Display support	Max four displays combination	4 × 4K DCI at 60Hz at 10-bit		—N/a	
Power
Power	Battery		11.76 V 99.8 W·h (8486 mA·h)		11.4 V 58.2 W·h (5152 mA·h) with 1000 battery cycle count	11.47 V 58 W·h (5083 mA·h)
Power	Power Adapter		96 W USB-C		61 W USB-C	
Power	Charging Method		USB-C ports			
Dimensions
Dimensions	Height		0.64 in (1.6 cm)		0.61 in (1.5 cm)	
Dimensions	Width		14.09 in (35.8 cm)		11.97 in (30.4 cm)	
Dimensions	Depth		9.68 in (24.6 cm)		8.36 in (21.2 cm)	
Weight			4.3 lb (1.95 kg)		3.1 lb (1.41 kg)	
Total greenhouse gas emissions			394 kg CO_{2}e (6-core CPU, 512 GB storage)	465 kg CO_{2}e (8-core CPU, 1 TB storage)	217 kg CO_{2}e (256 GB storage)	251 kg CO_{2}e (512 GB storage)
Model details
Model details	Model number		A2141		A2289	A2251
Model details	Hardware strings		MacBookPro16,1		MacBookPro16,3	MacBookPro16,2
Model details	Part/order number (Space Gray at first, Silver at last)		MVVJ2, MVVL2	MVVK2, MVVM2	MXK72, MXK52	MWP42, MWP72
Model details	MSRP(USD)		$2399	$2799	$1299	$1799
Timeline
Timeline	Announced Date		November 13, 2019		May 4, 2020	
Timeline	Released Date		November 13, 2019		May 4, 2020	
Timeline	Discontinued Date		October 18, 2021		November 10, 2020	October 18, 2021
Timeline	Unsupported Date		Security fixes only			

== Software and operating systems ==
The macOS operating system has been pre-installed on all MacBook Pro computers since release, starting with version 10.4.5 (Tiger). Along with OS X, iLife has also shipped with all systems, beginning with iLife '06.

The Intel-based MacBook Pro comes with the successor to BIOS, Extensible Firmware Interface (EFI) 1.1. EFI handles booting differently from BIOS-based computers, but provides backwards compatibility, allowing dual- and triple-boot configurations. In addition to OS X, the Microsoft Windows operating system is installable on Intel x86-based Apple computers. Officially, this is limited to 32-bit versions of Windows XP, Vista, and 7, and 64-bit versions of Windows Vista, 7, 8, 8.1, and 10 with the necessary hardware drivers included with the Boot Camp software. Other x86 operating systems such as Linux are also unofficially supported. This is made possible by the presence of the Intel architecture as provided by the CPU and the BIOS emulation Apple has provided on top of EFI.

macOS Sequoia (version 15), the 2024 release of macOS, will work with Wi-Fi and graphics acceleration on unsupported MacBook Pro computers with a compatible patch utility. macOS Tahoe (version 26) is the last major version of macOS with support for Intel processors, and subsequent releases will only be compiled for Apple silicon (ARM64) chips.

Supported macOS releases
macOS release
macOS release	Aluminum					Unibody							Retina							Touch Bar and Function Keys						
macOS release	Original	Late 2006	Mid 2007	Late 2007	Early 2008	Late 2008	Early 2009	Mid 2009	Mid 2010	Early 2011	Late 2011	Mid 2012		Late 2012	Early 2013	Late 2013	Mid 2014	Early 2015	Mid 2015	2016	2017	2018	2019	16", 2019	2020, 2x TB3	2020, 4x TB3
10.4 Tiger	10.4.5; 10.4.6 (Note: 15-inch Glossy and 17-inch models.)	10.4.8	10.4.9	Unofficial	Partial (Note: Requires a 2007 MacBook Pro install (10.4.9 minimum). Trackpad settings and function keys are unavailable (The top case needs to be replaced with a 2007 model to work). Audio input/output will only work with "Mac OS X 10.4.11 Combo Update".)	—N/a	—N/a	—N/a	—N/a	—N/a	—N/a	—N/a	—N/a	—N/a	—N/a	—N/a	—N/a	—N/a	—N/a	—N/a	—N/a	—N/a	—N/a	—N/a	—N/a	—N/a
10.5 Leopard	Yes	Yes	Yes	Yes	10.5.2; 10.5.4 (Note: Late 2008 17-inch model.)	10.5.5	10.5.6	10.5.7	—N/a	—N/a	—N/a	—N/a	—N/a	—N/a	—N/a	—N/a	—N/a	—N/a	—N/a	—N/a	—N/a	—N/a	—N/a	—N/a	—N/a	—N/a
10.6 Snow Leopard	With 1 GB RAM	Yes	Yes	Yes	Yes	Yes	Yes	Yes	10.6.3	10.6.6	Unofficial	Partial, Patch (Note: Requires "mach_kernel" patch. Even if the latest software updates are installed, sound, sleep, screen brightness and graphics acceleration will not work.)	Unconfirmed			—N/a	—N/a	—N/a	—N/a	—N/a	—N/a	—N/a	—N/a	—N/a	—N/a	—N/a
10.7 Lion	Patch, With 2 GB RAM (Note: Requires system files patching. Up to 10.7.3 or 10.7.5 with no Wi-Fi.)	With 2 GB RAM	Yes	Yes	Yes	Yes	Yes	Yes	Yes	Yes	10.7.2	10.7.4		Unconfirmed		—N/a	—N/a	—N/a	—N/a	—N/a	—N/a	—N/a	—N/a	—N/a	—N/a	—N/a
10.8 Mountain Lion	No	Patch, With 2 GB RAM (Note: The ATI Radeon X1600 graphics acceleration was ported to OS X 10.8 and 10.9, and is incompatible with OS X 10.10 and later. However, the framebuffer is still available.)	Yes	Yes	Yes	Yes	Yes	Yes	Yes	Yes	Yes	Yes	Yes	10.8.1	10.8.2	Partial (Note: PlatformSupport.plist needs to be changed or deleted. Audio input/output and display scaling will not work properly.)		—N/a	—N/a	—N/a	—N/a	—N/a	—N/a	—N/a	—N/a	—N/a
10.9 Mavericks	No	Patch, With 2 GB RAM	Yes	Yes	Yes	Yes	Yes	Yes	Yes	Yes	Yes	Yes	Yes	Yes	Yes	Yes	10.9.4	—N/a	—N/a	—N/a	—N/a	—N/a	—N/a	—N/a	—N/a	—N/a
10.10 Yosemite	No	Patch, With 2 GB RAM	Yes	Yes	Yes	Yes	Yes	Yes	Yes	Yes	Yes	Yes	Yes	Yes	Yes	Yes	Yes	10.10.2	10.10.3	—N/a	—N/a	—N/a	—N/a	—N/a	—N/a	—N/a
10.11 El Capitan	No	Patch, With 2 GB RAM	Yes	Yes	Yes	Yes	Yes	Yes	Yes	Yes	Yes	Yes	Yes	Yes	Yes	Yes	Yes	Yes	Yes	—N/a	—N/a	—N/a	—N/a	—N/a	—N/a	—N/a
10.12 Sierra	No	No	No	No	Patch				Yes	Yes	Yes	Yes	Yes	Yes	Yes	Yes	Yes	Yes	Yes	Yes (Note: 13-inch Function Keys models.); 10.12.1 (Note: Touch Bar models.)	10.12.5	—N/a	—N/a	—N/a	—N/a	—N/a
10.13 High Sierra	No	No	No	No	Patch				Yes	Yes	Yes	Yes	Yes	Yes	Yes	Yes	Yes	Yes	Yes	Yes	Yes	10.13.6	—N/a	—N/a	—N/a	—N/a
10.14 Mojave	No	No	No	No	Patch							Yes	Yes	Yes	Yes	Yes	Yes	Yes	Yes	Yes	Yes	Yes	10.14.5	—N/a	—N/a	—N/a
10.15 Catalina	No	No	No	No	Patch, With 4 GB RAM				Patch			Yes	Yes	Yes	Yes	Yes	Yes	Yes	Yes	Yes	Yes	Yes	Yes	10.15.1	10.15.4	
11 Big Sur	No	No	No	No	Patch, With 4 GB RAM				Patch							Yes	Yes	Yes	Yes	Yes	Yes	Yes	Yes	Yes	Yes	Yes
12 Monterey	No	No	No	No	Patch, With 4 GB RAM				Patch									Yes	Yes	Yes	Yes	Yes	Yes	Yes	Yes	Yes
13 Ventura	No	No	No	No	Patch, With 4 GB RAM				Patch												Yes	Yes	Yes	Yes	Yes	Yes
14 Sonoma	No	No	No	No	Patch, With 4 GB RAM				Patch													Yes	Yes	Yes	Yes	Yes
15 Sequoia	No	No	No	No	Patch, With 4 GB RAM				Patch													Yes	Yes	Yes	Yes	Yes
26 Tahoe (Note: macOS Tahoe is the final release of macOS to support Intel-based Macs.)	No	No	No	No	No	No	No	No	No	No	No	No	No	No	No	No	No	No	No	No	No	No	No	Yes	No	Yes

Supported Windows versions
OS release	Aluminum			Unibody			Retina			Touch Bar and Function Keys
OS release	2006 models	2007 models	2008–2009 models	Mid 2010	2011 models	Mid 2012	Late 2012–2014	Early 2015	Mid 2015	2016–2020 models
Windows XP (Note: Windows XP can only be installed on Macs with Boot Camp 3 or earlier. This includes Mac OS X 10.6 or earlier and copies of Mac OS X 10.7 that have not been updated to Boot Camp 4.) (Note: Only 32-bit editions of Windows XP are supported.)	Yes	Yes	Yes	Yes	No	No	No	No	No	No
Windows Vista 32-bit (Note: Windows Vista can only be installed on Macs with Boot Camp 3 or earlier. This includes Mac OS X 10.6 or earlier and copies of Mac OS X 10.7 that have not been updated to Boot Camp 4.)	Yes	Yes	Yes	Yes	No	No	No	No	No	No
Windows Vista 64-bit	Patch (Note: Only Late 2006 models are compatible with 64-bit versions of Windows.)	Patch	Yes	Yes	No	No	No	No	No	No
Windows 7 32-bit (Note: The 32-bit version of Windows 7 can only be installed on Macs with Boot Camp 3.1 to 6.0. This includes OS X 10.11 and earlier.)	Patch	Yes	Yes	Yes	Yes	Yes	No	No	No	No
Windows 7 64-bit (Note: The 64-bit version of Windows 7 can only be installed on Macs with Boot Camp 3.1 or later, running macOS High Sierra or earlier. Later versions of macOS no longer support Windows 7.)	Patch	Patch	Yes	Yes	Yes	Yes	Yes	No	No	No
Windows 8 (Note: Windows 8 can only be installed on Macs with Boot Camp 5.0 to 6.0. This includes OS X 10.11 and earlier.) (Note: Only 64-bit versions of Windows are supported for Windows 8 and later.)	Patch	Patch	Patch	Partial, Patch (Note: Only the 15 and 17-inch models of the Mid-2010 MacBook Pro support Windows 8 and 8.1. The 13-inch model is not supported.)	Yes	Yes	Yes	Yes	No	No
Windows 8.1 (Note: Windows 8.1 can only be installed on Macs with Boot Camp 5.1 or later, running macOS High Sierra or earlier. Later versions of macOS no longer support Windows 8.1.)	Patch	Patch	Patch	Partial, Patch	Yes	Yes	Yes	Yes	Yes	No
Windows 10 (Note: Windows 10 can only be installed on Macs with Boot Camp 6.0 or later. It is the only supported version of Windows on macOS Mojave and later.)	Patch	Patch	Patch	Patch	Patch	Yes	Yes	Yes	Yes	Yes

== Timeline ==
Timeline of portable Macintoshes
See also: List of Mac models

== See also ==
- MacBook (12-inch)
- MacBook Air
