= List of eponyms of Nvidia GPU microarchitectures =

This is a list of eponyms of Nvidia GPU microarchitectures. The eponym in this case is the person after whom an architecture is named. Listed are the person, their portrait, their profession or areas of expertise, their birth year, their death year, their country of origin, the microarchitecture named after them, and the year of release of the GPU architecture.

Eponyms of Nvidia GPU microarchitectures
Eponym	Profession	Origin	Architecture	Release year	Ref.
Daniel Gabriel Fahrenheit (1686–1736)	Physicist	(Polish–Lithuanian Commonwealth) Polish; (Dutch Republic) Naturalized Dutch	Fahrenheit	1998	
Anders Celsius (1701–1744)	Physicist and astronomer	(Sweden) Swedish	Celsius	1999	
William Thomson, 1st Baron Kelvin (1824–1907)	Mathematician, mathematical physicist and engineer	(United Kingdom) British	Kelvin	2001	
William Rankine (1820–1872)	Mechanical engineer	(Scotland) Scottish	Rankine	2003	
Marie Curie (1867–1934)	Physicist and chemist	(Poland) Polish; (France) Naturalized French	Curie	2004	
Nikola Tesla (1856–1943)	Inventor, electrical engineer, mechanical engineer, and futurist	(United States) Serbian American	Tesla	2006	
Enrico Fermi (1901–1954)	Physicist	(Kingdom of Italy) Italian; (United States) Naturalized American	Fermi	2010	
Johannes Kepler (1571–1630)	Astronomer, mathematician, astrologer, natural philosopher and writer on music	(Holy Roman Empire) German	Kepler	2012	
James Clerk Maxwell (1831–1879)	Mathematician and scientist	(Scotland) Scottish	Maxwell	2014	
Blaise Pascal (1623–1662)	Mathematician, physicist, inventor, philosopher, and Catholic writer	(France) French	Pascal	2016	
Alessandro Volta (1745–1827)	Physicist, chemist	(Kingdom of Italy) Italian	Volta	2017	
Alan Turing (1912–1954)	Mathematician, computer scientist, logician, cryptanalyst, philosopher, and theoretical biologist	(England) English	Turing	2018	
André-Marie Ampère (1775–1836)	Physicist and mathematician	(France) French	Ampere	2020	
Grace Hopper (1906–1992)	Computer scientist, mathematician, and United States Navy rear admiral	(United States) American	Hopper	2022	
Ada Lovelace (1815–1852)	Mathematician and writer	(England) English	Ada; Lovelace	2022	
David Blackwell (1919–2010)	Mathematician and statistician	(United States) American	Blackwell	2024	
Vera Rubin (1928–2016)	Astronomer, Astrophysicist	(United States) American	Rubin	2026	
Richard Feynman (1918–1988)	Theoretical physicist	(United States) American	Feynman	2028	
