= 6800 XT =

6800 XT may refer to:

- Nvidia GeForce 6800 XT
- AMD Radeon RX 6800 XT
