= Curie (microarchitecture) =

GPU microarchitecture by Nvidia

Nvidia Curie
- Release date: 2004
- Fabrication process: 130 nm, 110 nm, 90 nm, 80 nm

API support
- Direct3D: 9.0c
- OpenGL: 2.1

History
- Predecessor: Rankine
- Successor: Tesla

Support status
- Unsupported

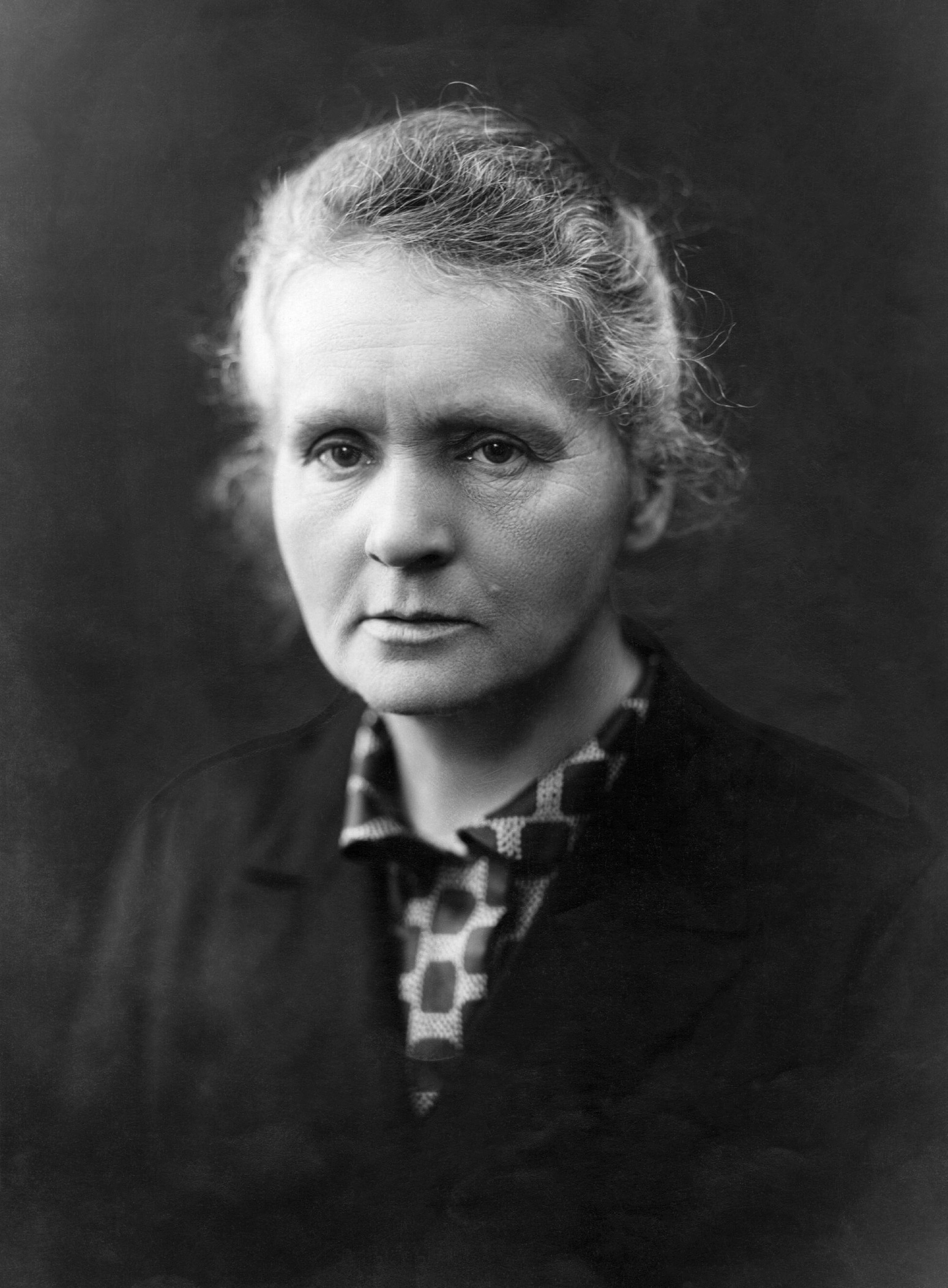
Marie Curie, eponym of architecture

Curie is the codename for a GPU microarchitecture developed by Nvidia, and released in 2004, as the successor to the Rankine microarchitecture. It was named with reference to the Polish physicist Marie Salomea Skłodowska–Curie and used with the GeForce 6 and 7 series. Curie was followed by Tesla.

== Graphics features ==
- DirectX 9.0c (9_3)
- OpenGL 2.1
- Shader Model 3.0
- Nvidia PureVideo (first generation)
- Reintroduced support for Z compression
- Hardware support for MSAA anti-aliasing algorithm (up to 4x)

The lack of unified shaders makes DirectX 9.0c the last supported version of DirectX for GPUs based on this microarchitecture.

== GPU list ==
=== GeForce 6 (6xxx) series ===
Model	Launch	Code name	Fab (nm)	Bus interface	Core clock (MHz)	Memory clock (MHz)	Core config^{1}	Fillrate				Memory			
Model	Launch	Code name	Fab (nm)	Bus interface	Core clock (MHz)	Memory clock (MHz)	Core config^{1}	MOperations/s	MPixels/s	MTexels/s	MVertices/s	Size (MB)	Bandwidth (GB/s)	Bus type	Bus width (bit)
GeForce 6100 + nForce 410	20 October 2005	MCP51	TSMC 90 nm	HyperTransport	425	100–200 (DDR) 200–533 (DDR2)	2:1:2:1	850	425	850	106.25	Up to 256 system RAM	1.6–6.4 (DDR) 3.2–17.056 (DDR2)	DDR DDR2	64 128
GeForce 6150 SE + nForce 430	June 2006	MCP61	TSMC 90 nm	HyperTransport	425	200 400	2:1:2:1	850	425	850	106.25	Up to 256 system RAM	3.2 16.0	DDR2	64 128
GeForce 6150 LE + nForce 430	June 2006	MCP61	TSMC 90 nm	HyperTransport	425	100–200 (DDR) 200–533 (DDR2)	2:1:2:1	850	425	850	106.25	Up to 256 system RAM	1.6–6.4 (DDR) 3.2–17.056 (DDR2)	DDR DDR2	64 128
GeForce 6150 + nForce 430	20 October 2005	MCP51	TSMC 90 nm	HyperTransport	475	100–200 (DDR) 200–533 (DDR2)	2:1:2:1	950	475	950	118.75	Up to 256 system RAM	1.6–6.4 (DDR) 3.2–17.056 (DDR2)	DDR DDR2	64 128
GeForce 6200 LE	2005	NV44	TSMC 110 nm	AGP 8× PCIe ×16	350	266	2:1:2:1	700	700	700	87.5	128 256	4.256	DDR	64
GeForce 6200A	4 April 2005	NV44A	TSMC 110 nm	AGP 8×	350	250 533 (DDR2)	4:3:4:2	1400	700	1400	175 225 (DDR2)	128 256 (DDR2) 512 (DDR2)	4 13.3 (DDR2)	DDR DDR2	64
GeForce 6200	12 October 2004 (PCIe) 17 January 2005 (AGP)	NV43	TSMC 110 nm	AGP 8× PCI PCIe ×16	300	275	4:3:4:4	1200	1200	1200	225	128 256	8.8	DDR2	128
GeForce 6200 TurboCache	15 December 2004	NV44	TSMC 110 nm	PCIe ×16	350	350	4:3:4:2	1400	700	1400	262.5	128–256 System RAM incl.16/32–64/128 onboard	5.6	DDR	64
GeForce 6500	1 October 2005	NV44	TSMC 110 nm	PCIe ×16	400	333	4:3:4:2	1600	800	1600	300	128 256	5.328	DDR	64
GeForce 6600 LE	2005	NV43	TSMC 110 nm	AGP 8× PCIe ×16	300	200	4:3:4:4	1200	1200	1200	225	128 256	6.4	DDR	128
GeForce 6600	12 August 2004	NV43	TSMC 110 nm	AGP 8× PCIe ×16	300	275 400	8:3:8:4	2400	1200	2400	225	128 256	8.8 12.8	DDR DDR2	128
GeForce 6600 GT	12 August 2004 (PCIe) 14 November 2004 (AGP)	NV43	TSMC 110 nm	AGP 8× PCIe ×16	500	475 (AGP) 500 (PCIe)	8:3:8:4	4000	2000	4000	375	128 256	15.2 (AGP) 16 (PCIe)	GDDR3	128
GeForce 6800 LE	22 July 2004 (AGP) 16 January 2005 (PCIe)	NV40 (AGP) NV41, NV42 (PCIe)	IBM 130 nm	AGP 8× PCIe ×16	320 (AGP) 325 (PCIe)	350	8:4:8:8	2560 (AGP) 2600 (PCIe)	2560 (AGP) 2600 (PCIe)	2560 (AGP) 2600 (PCIe)	320 (AGP) 325 (PCIe)	128	22.4	DDR	256
GeForce 6800 XT	30 September 2005	NV40 (AGP) NV41, NV42 (PCIe)	IBM 130 nm	AGP 8× PCIe ×16	300 (64 Bit) 325	266 (64 Bit) 350 500 (GDDR3)	8:4:8:8	2400 2600	2400 2600	2400 2600	300 325	256	4.256 11.2 22.4 32 (GDDR3)	DDR DDR2 GDDR3	64 128 256
GeForce 6800	14 April 2004 (AGP) 8 November 2004 (PCIe)	NV40 (AGP) NV41, NV42 (PCIe)	IBM 130 nm	AGP 8× PCIe ×16	325	350	12:5:12:12	3900	3900	3900	406.25	128 256	22.4	DDR	256
GeForce 6800 GTO	14 April 2004	NV45	IBM 130 nm	PCIe ×16		450	12:5:12:12	4200	4200	4200	437.5	256	28.8	GDDR3	256
GeForce 6800 GS	7 November 2005 (PCIe) 8 December 2005 (AGP)	NV42 (PCIe) NV40 (AGP)	TSMC 110 nm	AGP 8× PCIe ×16	425 (PCIe) 350 (AGP)	500	12:5:12:12	5100	5100	5100	531.25	128 256	32	GDDR3	256
GeForce 6800 GT	4 May 2004 (AGP) 28 June 2004 (PCIe)	NV40 (AGP) NV45 (PCIe)	IBM 130 nm	AGP 8× PCIe ×16	350	500	16:6:16:16	5600	5600	5600	525	128 256	32	GDDR3	256
GeForce 6800 Ultra	4 May 2004 (AGP) 28 June 2004 (PCIe) 14 March 2005 (512 MB)	NV40 (AGP) NV45 (PCIe)	IBM 130 nm	AGP 8× PCIe ×16	400	525 (512 MB) 550 (256 MB)	16:6:16:16	6400	6400	6400	600	256 512	33.6 (512 MB) 35.2 (256 MB)	GDDR3	256
GeForce 6800 Ultra Extreme Edition	4 May 2004	NV40	IBM 130 nm	AGP 8×	450	600	16:6:16:16	7200	7200	7200	675	256	35.2	GDDR3	256
Model	Launch	Code name	Fab (nm)	Bus interface	Core clock (MHz)	Memory clock (MHz)	Core config^{1}	Fillrate				Memory			
Model	Launch	Code name	Fab (nm)	Bus interface	Core clock (MHz)	Memory clock (MHz)	Core config^{1}	MOperations/s	MPixels/s	MTexels/s	MVertices/s	Size (MB)	Bandwidth (GB/s)	Bus type	Bus width (bit)

==== Features ====
Model	Features			
Model	OpenEXR HDR	Scalable Link Interface (SLI)	TurboCache	PureVideo WMV9 Decoding
GeForce 6100	No	No	No	Limited
GeForce 6150 SE	No	No	Driver-Side Only	Limited
GeForce 6150	No	No	No	Yes
GeForce 6150 LE	No	No	Driver-Side Only	Yes
GeForce 6200	No	No	Yes (PCIe only)	Yes
GeForce 6500	No	Yes	Yes	Yes
GeForce 6600 LE	Yes	Yes (No SLI Connector)	No	Yes
GeForce 6600	Yes	Yes (SLI Connector or PCIe Interface)	No	Yes
GeForce 6600 DDR2	Yes	Yes (SLI Connector or PCIe Interface)	No	Yes
GeForce 6600 GT	Yes	Yes	No	Yes
GeForce 6800 LE	Yes	No	No	No
GeForce 6800 XT	Yes	Yes (PCIe only)	No	Yes (NV42 only)
GeForce 6800	Yes	Yes (PCIe only)	No	Yes (NV41, NV42 only)
GeForce 6800 GTO	Yes	Yes	No	No
GeForce 6800 GS	Yes	Yes (PCIe only)	No	Yes (NV42 only)
GeForce 6800 GT	Yes	Yes (PCIe only)	No	No
GeForce 6800 Ultra	Yes	Yes (PCIe only)	No	No

=== GeForce 7 (7xxx) series ===
Model	Launch	Code name	Fab (nm)	Bus interface	Core clock (MHz)	Memory clock (MHz)	Core config^{1}	Fillrate				Memory			
Model	Launch	Code name	Fab (nm)	Bus interface	Core clock (MHz)	Memory clock (MHz)	Core config^{1}	MOperations/s	MPixels/s	MTexels/s	MVertices/s	Size (MB)	Bandwidth (GB/s)	Bus type	Bus width (bit)
GeForce 7025 + nForce 630a	July 2007	MCP68S	TSMC 110 nm	HyperTransport	425	200 (DDR) 400 (DDR2) 933 (DDR3)	2:1:2:2	850	850	850	106.25	Up to 256 system RAM	6.4 12.8 34	DDR DDR2 DDR3	64 128
GeForce 7050PV + nForce 630a	July 2007	MCP67QV	TSMC 110 nm	HyperTransport	425	200 (DDR) 400 (DDR2) 933 (DDR3)	2:1:2:2	850	850	850	106.25	Up to 256 system RAM	6.4 12.8 34	DDR DDR2 DDR3	64 128
GeForce 7050 + nForce 610i/630i	July 2007	MCP73	TSMC 90 nm	HyperTransport/FSB	500	333	2:1:2:2	1000	1000	1000	125	Up to 256 system RAM	5.336	DDR2	64
GeForce 7100 + nForce 630i	July 2007	MCP76	TSMC 90 nm	FSB	600	400	2:1:2:2	1200	1200	1200	150	Up to 256 system RAM	6.4	DDR2	64
GeForce 7150 + nForce 630i	July 2007	MCP76	TSMC 90 nm	FSB	630	400	2:1:2:2	1260	1260	1260	157.5	Up to 256 system RAM	6.4	DDR2	64
GeForce 7100 GS	8 August 2006	NV44	TSMC 110 nm	PCIe ×16	350	300	4:3:4:2	1400	700	1400	262.5	128 256	2.4 4.8	DDR DDR2	32 64
GeForce 7200 GS	18 January 2006	G72	TSMC 90 nm	PCIe ×16	450	400	2:2:4:2	1800	900	1800	337.5	128 256	3.2 6.4	DDR2	32 64
GeForce 7300 SE	22 March 2006	G72	TSMC 90 nm	PCIe ×16	350	333	4:3:4:2	1800	900	1800	337.5	128	2.656 5.328	DDR2	32 64
GeForce 7300 LE	22 March 2006	G72	TSMC 90 nm	PCIe ×16	350	333	4:3:4:2	1800	900	1800	337.5	128	2.656 5.328	DDR2	32 64
GeForce 7300 GS	18 January 2006	G72	TSMC 90 nm	PCIe ×16	550	400	4:3:4:2	2200	1100	2200	412.5	128 256	6.4	DDR2	64
GeForce 7300 GT	15 May 2006	G73	TSMC 90 nm	AGP 8× PCIe ×16	350	325 (DDR2) 700 (GDDR3)	8:5:8:4	2800	1400	2800	437.5	128 256	10.4 22.4	DDR2 GDDR3	128
GeForce 7500 LE	2006	G72	TSMC 90 nm	PCIe ×16	263 324	275	4:3:4:2	900 1100	900 1100	2200	412.5	64 128 256	2.6 6.8	DDR2	32 64
GeForce 7600 GS	22 March 2006 (PCIe) 1 July 2006 (AGP)	G73	TSMC 90 nm	AGP 8× PCIe ×16	400	400 (DDR2) 700 (GDDR3)	12:5:12:8	4800	3200	4800	500	256	12.8 22.4	DDR2 GDDR3	128
GeForce 7600 GT	9 March 2006 (PCIe) 15 July 2006 (AGP)	G73	TSMC 90 nm	AGP 8× PCIe ×16	560	400 (DDR2) 700 (GDDR3)	12:5:12:8	6720	4480	6720	700	256	12.8 22.4	DDR2 GDDR3	128
GeForce 7600 GT 80 nm	8 January 2007	G73-B1	TSMC 80 nm	AGP 8× PCIe ×16	560	400 (DDR2) 700 (GDDR3)	12:5:12:8	6720	4480	6720	700	256	12.8 22.4	DDR2 GDDR3	128
GeForce 7650 GS	22 March 2006	G73	TSMC 80 nm	PCIe ×16	450	400	12:5:12:8	5400	3600	5400	562.5	256	12.7	DDR2	128
GeForce 7800 GS	2 February 2006	G70	TSMC 110 nm	AGP 8×	375	600	16:8:16:8	6000	3000	6000	750	256	38.4	GDDR3	256
GeForce 7800 GT	11 August 2005	G70	TSMC 110 nm	PCIe ×16	400	500	20:7:20:16	8000	6400	8000	700	256	32	GDDR3	256
GeForce 7800 GTX	22 June 2005 (256 MB) 14 November 2005 (512 MB)	G70	TSMC 110 nm	PCIe ×16	430 (256 MB) 550 (512 MB)	600 (256 MB) 850 (512 MB)	24:8:24:16	10320 (256 MB) 13200 (512 MB)	6880 (256 MB) 8800 (512 MB)	10320 (256 MB) 13200 (512 MB)	860 (256 MB) 1100 (512 MB)	256 512	38.4 (256 MB) 54.4 (512 MB)	GDDR3	256
GeForce 7900 GS	May 2006 (PCIe) 2 April 2007 (AGP)	G71	TSMC 90 nm	AGP 8× PCIe ×16	450	660	20:7:20:16	9000	7200	9000	787.5	256	42.24	GDDR3	256
GeForce 7900 GT	9 March 2006	G71	TSMC 90 nm	PCIe ×16	450	660	24:8:24:16	10800	7200	10800	900	256	42.24	GDDR3	256
GeForce 7900 GTO	1 October 2006	G71	TSMC 90 nm	PCIe ×16	650	660	24:8:24:16	15600	10400	15600	1300	512	42.24	GDDR3	256
GeForce 7900 GTX	9 March 2006	G71	TSMC 90 nm	PCIe ×16	650	800	24:8:24:16	15600	10400	15600	1300	512	51.2	GDDR3	256
GeForce 7900 GX2	9 March 2006	2× G71	TSMC 90 nm	PCIe ×16	500	600	2× 24:8:24:16	24000	16000	24000	2000	2× 512	2x 38.4	GDDR3	256
GeForce 7950 GT	6 September 2006 (PCIe) 2 April 2007 (AGP)	G71	TSMC 90 nm	AGP 8× PCIe ×16	550	700	24:8:24:16	13200	8800	13200	1100	512	44.8	GDDR3	256
GeForce 7950 GX2	5 June 2006	2× G71	TSMC 90 nm	PCIe ×16	500	600	2× 24:8:24:16	24000	16000	24000	2000	2× 512	2x 38.4	GDDR3	256
Model	Launch	Code name	Fab (nm)	Bus interface	Core clock (MHz)	Memory clock (MHz)	Core config^{1}	Fillrate				Memory			
Model	Launch	Code name	Fab (nm)	Bus interface	Core clock (MHz)	Memory clock (MHz)	Core config^{1}	MOperations/s	MPixels/s	MTexels/s	MVertices/s	Size (MB)	Bandwidth (GB/s)	Bus type	Bus width (bit)

==== Features ====
Model	Features				
Model	Gamma-correct antialiasing	64-bit OpenEXR HDR	Scalable Link Interface (SLI)	TurboCache	Dual Link DVI
GeForce 7100 GS	No	No	Yes (PCIe only, No SLI bridge)	Yes	No
GeForce 7200 GS	Yes	Yes	No	Yes	No
GeForce 7300 SE	Yes	Yes	No	Yes	No
GeForce 7300 LE	Yes	Yes	No	Yes	No
GeForce 7300 GS	Yes	Yes	Yes (PCIe only)	Yes	No
GeForce 7300 GT	Yes	Yes	Yes (PCIe only, No SLI bridge)	No	One port
GeForce 7600 GS	Yes	Yes	Yes (PCIe only)	No	One port
GeForce 7600 GT	Yes	Yes	Yes (PCIe only)	No	One port
GeForce 7600 GT (80 nm)	Yes	Yes	Yes	No	One port
GeForce 7650 GS (80 nm)	Yes	Yes	Yes (Depending on OEM Design)	No	One port
GeForce 7800 GS	Yes	Yes	No	No	One port
GeForce 7800 GT	Yes	Yes	Yes	No	One port
GeForce 7800 GTX	Yes	Yes	Yes	No	One port
GeForce 7800 GTX 512	Yes	Yes	Yes	No	One port
GeForce 7900 GS	Yes	Yes	Yes (PCIe only)	No	Two ports
GeForce 7900 GT	Yes	Yes	Yes	No	Two ports
GeForce 7900 GTO	Yes	Yes	Yes	No	Two ports
GeForce 7900 GTX	Yes	Yes	Yes	No	Two ports
GeForce 7900 GX2 (GTX Duo)	Yes	Yes	Yes	No	Two ports
GeForce 7950 GT	Yes	Yes	Yes (PCIe only)	No	Two ports
GeForce 7950 GX2	Yes	Yes	Yes	No	Two ports

== See also ==
- List of Nvidia graphics processing units
- Nvidia PureVideo
- Scalable Link Interface (SLI)
- Qualcomm Adreno
