= Feynman (microarchitecture) =

Nvidia GPU microarchitecture planned for 2028

- Launching: 2028 (planned)
- Designed by: Nvidia
- Manufactured by: TSMC
- Fabrication process: Reportedly TSMC 1.6 nm-class (A16)

Specifications
- Memory support: Custom HBM

History
- Predecessor: Rubin / Rubin Ultra

Feynman is a microarchitecture for GPUs by Nvidia, planned for release in 2028 as the successor to Rubin and Rubin Ultra. It was first announced by CEO Jensen Huang at Nvidia GTC in March 2025 and is named after the theoretical physicist Richard Feynman. Feynman is aimed at AI data centers rather than consumer graphics.

At GTC 2026, Nvidia confirmed that Feynman would be the first Nvidia GPU to use three-dimensional stacking of multiple GPU logic dies, together with custom HBM, and that it would be paired with the Rosa CPU, a successor to Vera. Nvidia has said it is using its own Blackwell GPUs to accelerate the design and manufacture of Feynman.

== History ==
Feynman first appeared on Nvidia's data center roadmap at GTC 2025, listed for 2028 after Blackwell Ultra (2025), Rubin (2026) and Rubin Ultra (2027), with "next-gen HBM" as its memory. The name continues Nvidia's practice of naming data center architectures after scientists; see List of eponyms of Nvidia GPU microarchitectures.

The roadmap shown at GTC 2026 added several details. The memory entry changed from "next-gen HBM" to "custom HBM", GPU die stacking was confirmed, and a previously unmentioned CPU, Rosa, was listed alongside Feynman. Trade press noted that Rosa's appearance suggested Nvidia had shortened its CPU development cycle from roughly four years to two.

== Architecture ==
=== 3D die stacking ===
Feynman is expected to move from the side-by-side ("2.5D") layout used by Blackwell and Rubin to stacking multiple GPU dies on top of one another. Commentators described this as the first use of stacked logic dies in an Nvidia GPU. 3D stacking shortens signal paths and increases packing density, but heat removal from the lower dies is a known obstacle to mass production; until now, large-scale 3D stacking has mostly involved low-power cache dies, as in AMD's Ryzen X3D processors.

=== Custom HBM ===
Feynman will use custom HBM rather than a standard successor to HBM4E. Tom's Hardware suggested this is most likely a variant of customizable HBM4E and could raise capacity beyond 1 TB per GPU package. In custom HBM, the DRAM stack's base logic die is replaced by a customer-designed die as part of a 3D system in package. The DRAM dies themselves would still come from memory makers.

=== Packaging and interconnect ===
Reports of the GTC 2026 keynote state that Intel would supply EMIB advanced packaging for Feynman's I/O die. Nvidia's roadmap also showed NVLink scale-up using both copper and optical links, with co-packaged optics expected to debut with Feynman.

=== Manufacturing ===
Feynman GPUs are reportedly slated for production on TSMC's 1.6 nm-class process. Nvidia has not published detailed specifications for the architecture.

== Platform ==
The 2028 platform shown at GTC 2026 pairs Feynman with:

- the Rosa CPU, the successor to Vera, which uses Arm-based cores and emphasizes single-thread performance;
- the LP40 language processing unit, developed with the team from Groq;
- the Kyber rack architecture scaled to NVL1152, eight times the GPU density of Rubin's NVL144 configuration.

== Roadmap context ==
| Architecture | Year | Notes |
|---|---|---|
| Blackwell / Blackwell Ultra | 2024–2025 | Predecessor generations |
| Rubin | 2026 | Paired with Vera CPU |
| Rubin Ultra | 2027 | Kyber rack architecture |
| Feynman | 2028 | 3D die stacking, custom HBM, Rosa CPU |

== See also ==
- List of eponyms of Nvidia GPU microarchitectures
- High Bandwidth Memory
- Three-dimensional integrated circuit
