= Rankine (microarchitecture) =

GPU microarchitecture by Nvidia

Nvidia Rankine
- Release date: 2003-2005 2003
- Architecture: Rankine
- Fabrication process: 150 nm, 140 nm, 130 nm

API support
- DirectX: 9.0
- OpenGL: 1.5 (2.1)

History
- Predecessor: Kelvin
- Successor: Curie

Support status
- Unsupported

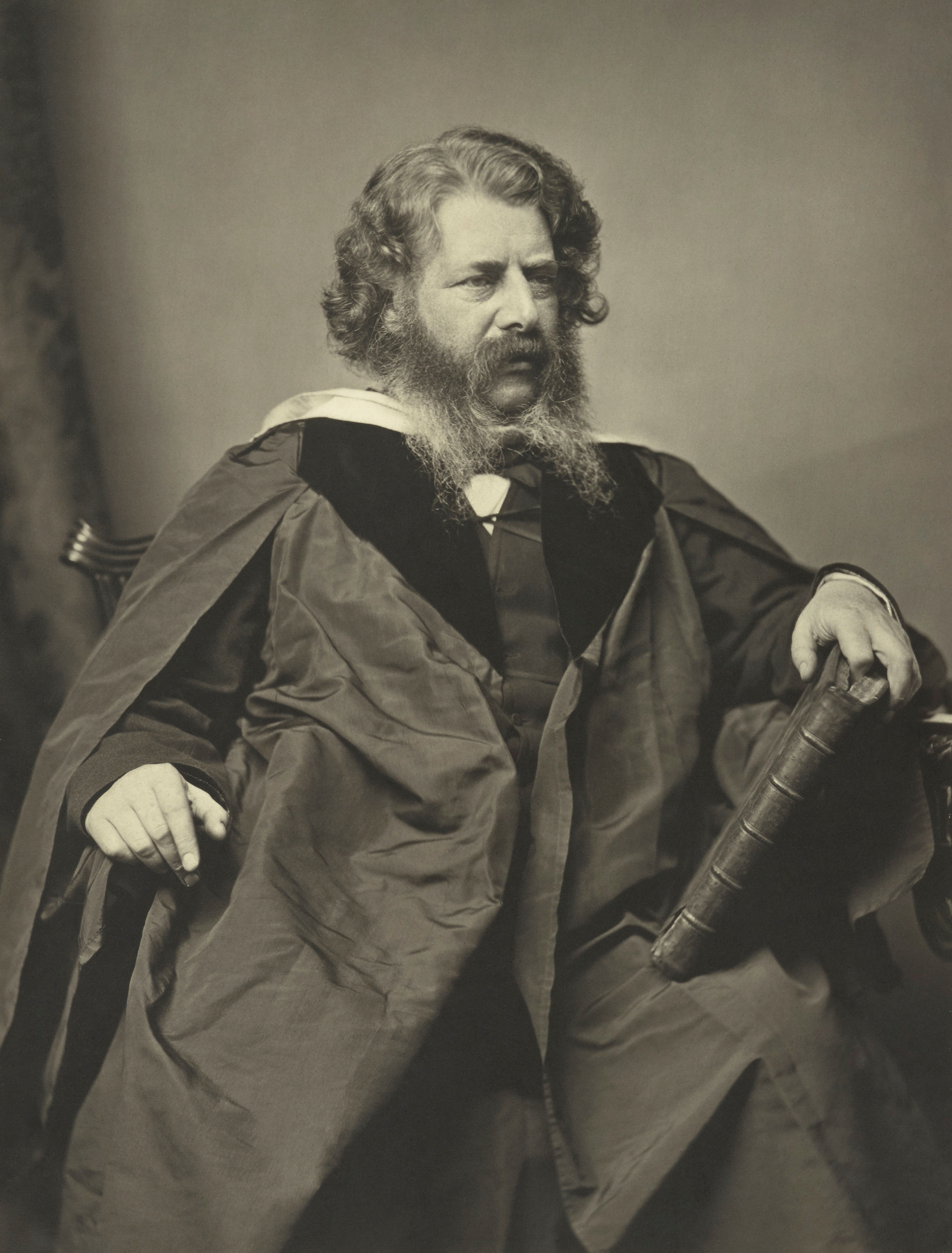
Photo of William Rankine, eponym of architecture

Rankine is the codename for a GPU microarchitecture developed by Nvidia, and released in 2003, as the successor to the Kelvin microarchitecture. It was named with reference to Macquorn Rankine and used with the GeForce FX series.

== Graphics features ==
- DirectX 9.0a
- OpenGL 1.5 (2.1)
- Shader Model 2.0a
- Vertex Shader 2.0a
- Max VRAM size bumped to 256MB

== Chips ==
=== GeForce FX series and GeForce FX (5xxx) series ===
- NV39, 82 million transistor
- NV38, 135 million transistor
- NV37, 45 million transistor
- NV36, 82 million transistor
- NV35
- NV34
- NV31
- NV30, 125 million transistor

== GPU list ==
=== GeForce 5 (5xxx) series ===
Model	Launch	Code name	Fab (nm)	Bus interface	Core clock (MHz)	Memory clock (MHz)	Core config^{1}	Fillrate				Memory			
Model	Launch	Code name	Fab (nm)	Bus interface	Core clock (MHz)	Memory clock (MHz)	Core config^{1}	MOperations/s	MPixels/s	MTexels/s	MVertices/s	Size (MB)	Bandwidth (GB/s)	Bus type	Bus width (bit)
GeForce FX 5100	March 2003	NV34	TSMC 150 nm	AGP 8×	200	166	4:2:4:4	800	800	800	50	64 128	2.7	DDR	64
GeForce FX 5200 LE	March 2003	NV34	TSMC 150 nm	AGP 8×	250	166	4:2:4:4	1000	1000	1000	62.5	64 128 256	2.7 5.3	DDR	64 128
GeForce FX 5200	March 2003	NV34	TSMC 150 nm	AGP 8× PCI	250	200	4:2:4:4	1000	1000	1000	62.5	64 128 256	3.2 6.4	DDR	64 128
GeForce FX 5200 Ultra	6 March 2003	NV34	TSMC 150 nm	AGP 8×	325	325	4:2:4:4	1300	1300	1300	81.25	64 128 256	10.4	DDR	128
GeForce PCX 5300	17 March 2004	NV34	TSMC 150 nm	PCIe ×16	250	166	4:2:4:4	1000	1000	1000	62.5	128 256	2.7	DDR	64
GeForce FX 5500	March 2004	NV34B	TSMC 140 nm	AGP 8× AGP 4× PCI	270	200	4:2:4:4	1080	1080	1080	67.5	64 128 256	3.2 6.4	DDR	64 128
GeForce FX 5600 XT	October 2003	NV31	TSMC 130 nm	AGP 8×	235	200	4:2:4:4	940	940	940	58.75	64 128	3.2 6.4	DDR	64 128
GeForce FX 5600	March 2003	NV31	TSMC 130 nm	AGP 8× PCI	325	275	4:2:4:4	1300	1300	1300	81.25	64 128 256	8.8	DDR	128
GeForce FX 5600 Ultra	6 March 2003	NV31	TSMC 130 nm	AGP 8×	350	350	4:2:4:4	1400	1400	1400	87.5	64 128	11.2	DDR	128
GeForce FX 5600 Ultra Rev.2	6 March 2003	NV31	TSMC 130 nm	AGP 8×	400	400	4:2:4:4	1600	1600	1600	100	64 128	12.8	DDR	128
GeForce FX 5700 VE	September 2004	NV36	IBM 130 nm	AGP 8×	235	200	4:3:4:4	940	940	940	106.5	128 256	3.2 6.4	DDR	64 128
GeForce FX 5700 LE	March 2004	NV36	IBM 130 nm	AGP 8× PCI	250	200	4:3:4:4	1000	1000	1000	187.5	128 256	3.2 6.4	DDR	64 128
GeForce FX 5700	2003	NV36	IBM 130 nm	AGP 8×	425	250	4:3:4:4	1700	1700	1700	318.75	128 256	8	DDR	128
GeForce PCX 5750	17 March 2004	NV36	IBM 130 nm	PCIe ×16	425	250	4:3:4:4	1700	1700	1700	318.75	128	8	DDR	128
GeForce FX 5700 Ultra	23 October 2003	NV36	IBM 130 nm	AGP 8×	475	450	4:3:4:4	1900	1900	1900	356.25	128 256	14.4	GDDR2	128
GeForce FX 5700 Ultra GDDR3	15 March 2004	NV36	IBM 130 nm	AGP 8×	475	475	4:3:4:4	1900	1900	1900	356.25	128 256	15.2	GDDR3	128
GeForce FX 5800	27 January 2003	NV30	TSMC 130 nm	AGP 8×	400	400	4:2:8:4	1600	1600	3200	200	128	12.8	GDDR2	128
GeForce FX 5800 Ultra	27 January 2003	NV30	TSMC 130 nm	AGP 8×	500	500	4:2:8:4	2000	2000	4000	200	128	16	GDDR2	128
GeForce FX 5900 ZT	15 December 2003	NV35	TSMC 130 nm	AGP 8×	325	350	4:3:8:4	1300	1300	2600	343.75	128	22.4	DDR	256
GeForce FX 5900 XT	15 December 2003	NV35	TSMC 130 nm	AGP 8×	390	350	4:3:8:4	1600	1600	3200	300	128	22.4	DDR	256
GeForce FX 5900	May 2003	NV35	TSMC 130 nm	AGP 8×	400	425	4:3:8:4	1600	1600	3200	300	128	27.2	DDR	256
GeForce FX 5900 Ultra	12 May 2003	NV35	TSMC 130 nm	AGP 8×	450	425	4:3:8:4	1800	1800	3600	337.5	128 256	27.2	DDR	256
GeForce PCX 5900	17 March 2004	NV35	TSMC 130 nm	PCIe ×16	450	425	4:3:8:4	1800	1800	3600	337.5	128 256	27.2	DDR	256
GeForce FX 5950 Ultra	23 October 2003	NV38	TSMC 130 nm	AGP 8×	475	475	4:3:8:4	1900	1900	3800	356.25	256	30.4	DDR	256
GeForce PCX 5950	17 February 2004	NV38	TSMC 130 nm	PCIe ×16	475	475	4:3:8:4	1900	1900	3800	356.25	256	30.4	GDDR3	256
Model	Launch	Code name	Fab (nm)	Bus interface	Core clock (MHz)	Memory clock (MHz)	Core config^{1}	Fillrate				Memory			
Model	Launch	Code name	Fab (nm)	Bus interface	Core clock (MHz)	Memory clock (MHz)	Core config^{1}	MOperations/s	MPixels/s	MTexels/s	MVertices/s	Size (MB)	Bandwidth (GB/s)	Bus type	Bus width (bit)

== See also ==
- List of eponyms of Nvidia GPU microarchitectures
- List of Nvidia graphics processing units
- Nvidia PureVideo
- Scalable Link Interface (SLI)
- Qualcomm Adreno
