= TurboCache =

Technology by Nvidia

Nvidia's TurboCache technology is a method of allowing video cards more available video memory by using both onboard video memory and main system memory. Main memory is accessed using the high-bandwidth PCI-Express bus.

TurboCache was developed as a means to provide a better cost/performance ratio by reducing the amount of memory modules on the video card. According to Nvidia, a GeForce 6200 with TurboCache will perform about four times better than the Intel GMA 900. As with integrated graphics, the operating system may report a lower amount of main memory than is physically present when main memory is used.

When TurboCache was introduced on the GeForce 6200 with TurboCache, there was confusion over how much local memory a buyer could expect from the TurboCache enabled video card. This figure could lie between 16 and 128 MiB, with Nvidia listing only total memory from both video memory and main memory. Eventually, NVIDIA included only video memory sizes on marketing and packaging.

While TC can improve 3D quality in games using a great deal of video memory for texture rendering, performance of games utilizing a large percent of system RAM (such as EA Games' Battlefield series and their mods that typically consume 512 MB-1 GB RAM) can suffer dramatically on systems with 1 GB RAM or below. Some users of such setups have attempted to disable TurboCache. Such an option is not supported by NVIDIA's official drivers but can be accomplished using a registry modification for Windows XP users or a configuration file modification for X.Org Server users.

A video card with TurboCache typically is slower in 3D benchmarks than a similar video card which has its own discrete video memory.

With the release of Direct3D 10 providing virtual GPU memory, TurboCache was rendered obsolete in Windows as the graphics driver subsystem could transfer VRAM data in and out of system RAM if VRAM starts to get too full.

== See also ==
- HyperMemory - similar technology previously implemented by ATI Technologies
