= Rubin (microarchitecture) =

Nvidia microarchitecture

- Launching: 2H 2026
- Designed by: Nvidia
- Manufactured by: TSMC
- Fabrication process: 3NP or 3PN

Specifications
- Memory support: HBM4

History
- Predecessor: Blackwell
- Successor: Rubin Ultra (improved version); Feynman (direct successor)

Rubin is a microarchitecture for graphics processing units (GPUs) by Nvidia.

== History ==
It was announced at Computex in Taipei in 2024 by CEO Jensen Huang. It was scheduled for release in Q3 of 2026.

It entered full production in May 2026. The Dell PowerEdge XE9812 server rack featuring Vera Rubin NVL72 architecture was deployed to US AI infrastructure provider Coreweave in June, which then made it operational that September. In November 2026, UK AI cloud firm Nscale deployed the first Vera Rubin NVL72 rack internationally.

At Nvidia GTC 2025 it was announced that Rubin will be followed by an improved Rubin Ultra architecture in 2027. It would be in effect two of the Rubin cores connected together.

== Microarchitecture ==
It is named after the astrophysicist Vera Rubin and will consist of a GPU named Rubin and a CPU named Vera. The chips are manufactured by TSMC using a 3 nm process and will use HBM4 memory. Nvidia has been using Blackwell GPUs to accelerate the design of Vera, Rubin, and Rubin's successor, Feynman.

Rubin is reported to have 50 sparse petaflops performance in FP4 (4-bit floating point math, often used for AI), increased from 20 petaflops of AI performance in Blackwell, while Rubin Ultra will double the performance of Rubin with 100 sparse petaflops.
