= Nvidia BR02 =

Chip used in early PCI Express graphics cards by Nvidia

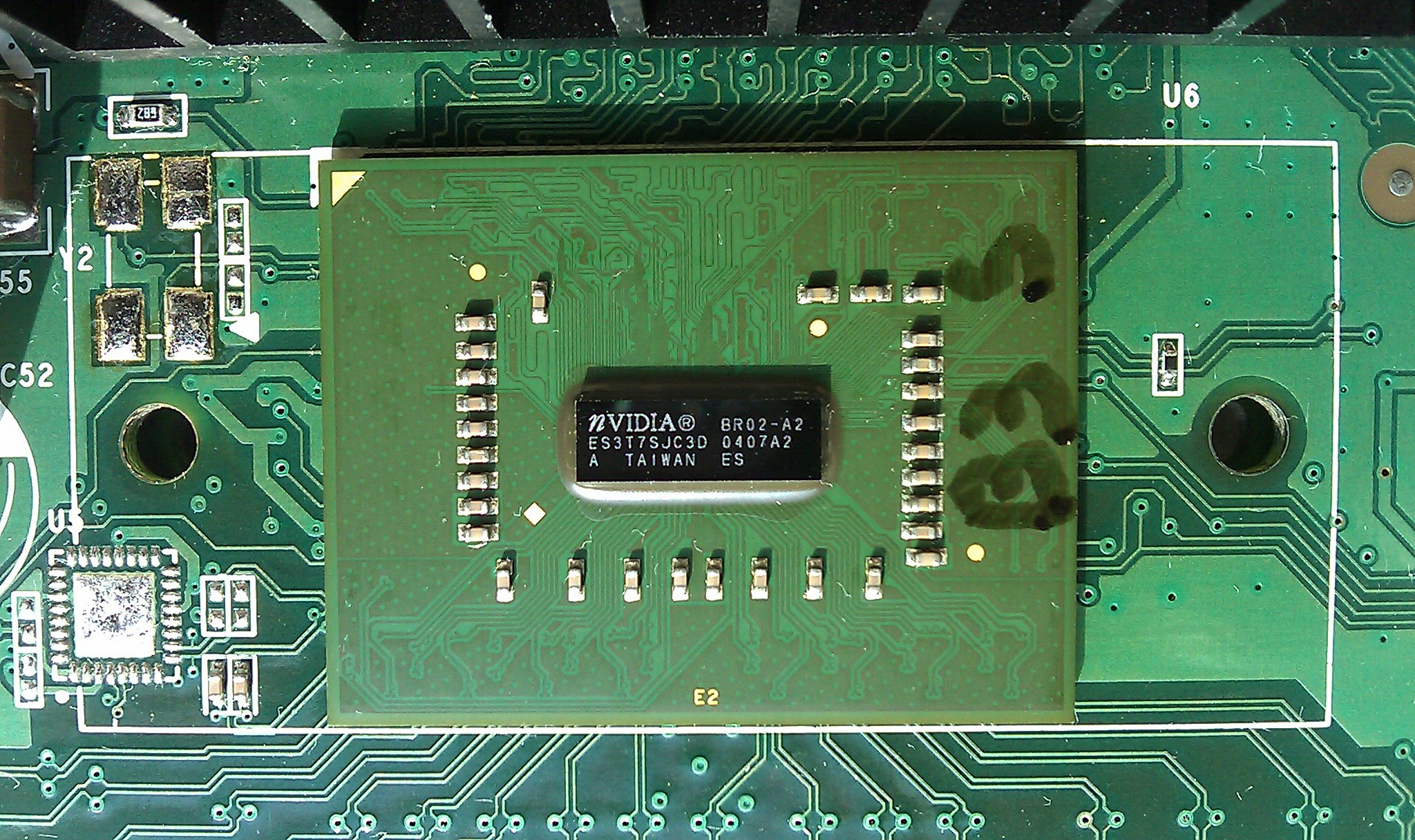
BR02 chip

Nvidia's BR02 "High Speed Interconnect" ("HSI") chip was used in their early PCI Express graphics cards, where it acted as a bridge between the PCI Express connection to the computer and the natively AGP GPU. This allowed Nvidia to release a PCI Express graphics card without redesigning the graphics card's GPU for the new interface. It was introduced in 2004.

Nvidia has also developed an HSI chip which works in the opposite direction, allowing natively PCI Express GPUs to be used in graphics cards released for the AGP interface.

This chip is no longer used on modern Nvidia GPUs due to the obsolescence of the AGP standard.
