= GeForce 6 series =

Series of GPUs by Nvidia

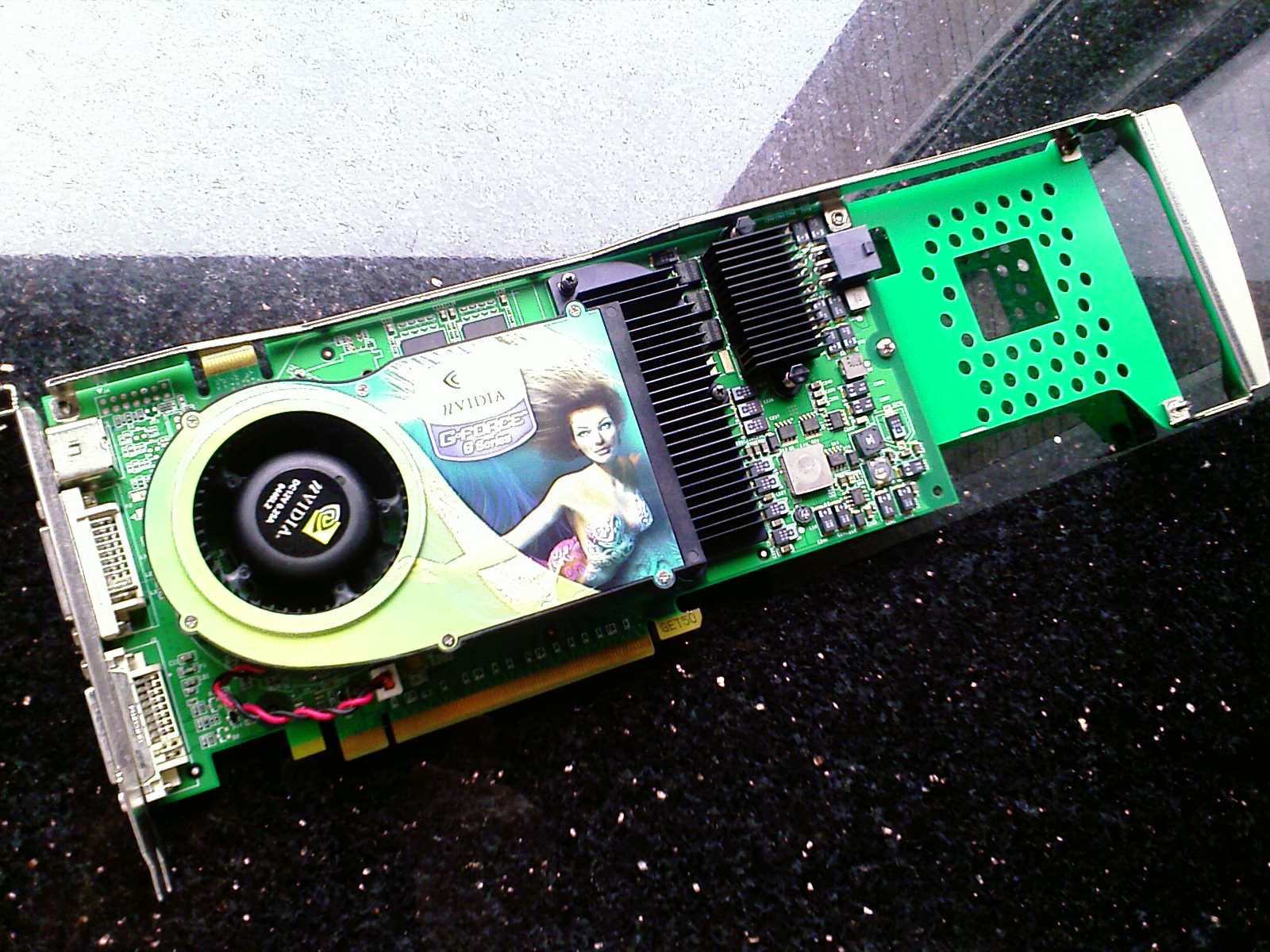
- Top: Logo of the series Bottom: A Nvidia GeForce 6800 Ultra released in 2004, one of the series' highest-end models
- Release date: April 14, 2004; 22 years ago
- Codename: NV4x
- Architecture: Curie
- Models: GeForce nForce series: GeForce SE series; GeForce LE series; GeForce XT series; GeForce GTO series; GeForce GS series; GeForce GT series; GeForce Ultra series; GeForce Ultra Extreme series

Cards
- Entry-level: 6100; 6150; 6200; 6500
- Mid-range: 6600; 6700
- High-end: 6800
- Enthusiast: 6800 Ultra / Ultra Extreme

API support
- Direct3D: Direct3D 9.0c Shader Model 3.0
- OpenGL: OpenGL 2.1

History
- Predecessor: GeForce 5 series
- Successor: GeForce 7 series

Support status
- Unsupported

The GeForce 6 series (codename NV40) is the sixth generation of Nvidia's GeForce line of graphics processing units. Launched on April 14, 2004, the GeForce 6 family introduced PureVideo post-processing for video, SLI technology, and Shader Model 3.0 support (compliant with Microsoft DirectX 9.0c specification and OpenGL 2.0).

== GeForce 6 series features ==
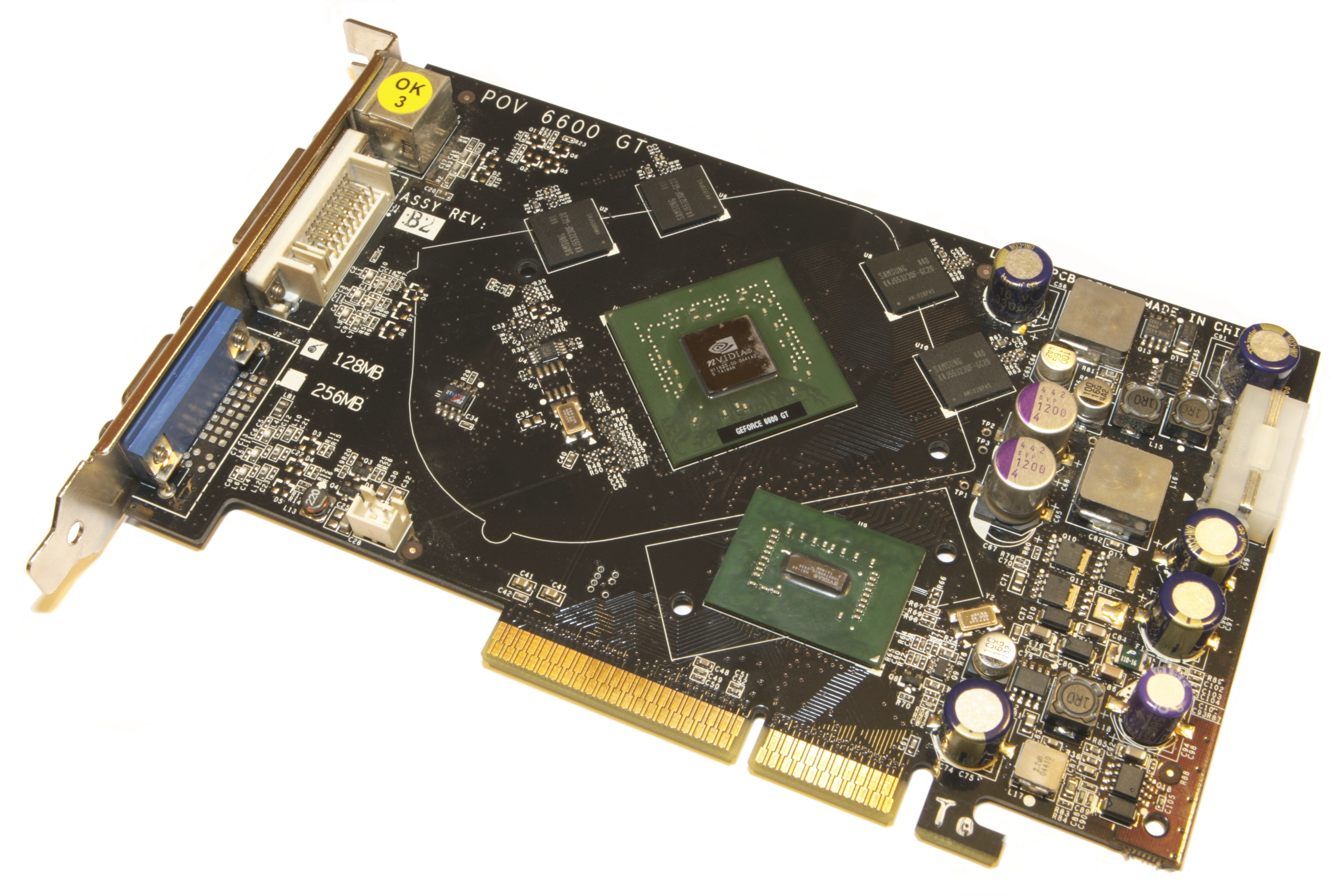
GeForce 6600 GT AGP

=== SLI ===
The Scalable Link Interface (SLI) allows two GeForce 6 cards of the same type to be connected in tandem. The driver software balances the workload between the cards. SLI-capability is limited to select members of the GeForce 6 family; 6500 and above. SLI is only available for cards utilizing the PCI-Express bus.

=== Nvidia PureVideo Technology ===
Nvidia PureVideo technology is the combination of a dedicated video processing core and software which decodes H.264, VC-1, WMV, and MPEG-2 videos with reduced CPU utilization.

=== Shader Model 3.0 ===
Nvidia was the first to deliver Shader Model 3.0 (SM3) capability in its GPUs. SM3 extends SM2 in a number of ways: standard FP32 (32-bit floating-point) precision, dynamic branching, increased efficiency and longer shader lengths are the main additions. Shader Model 3.0 was quickly adopted by game developers because it was quite simple to convert existing shaders coded with SM 2.0/2.0A/2.0B to version 3.0, and it offered noticeable performance improvements across the entire GeForce 6 line.

=== Caveats ===
PureVideo functionality varies by model, with some models lacking WMV9 and/or H.264 acceleration.

In addition, motherboards with some VIA and SIS chipsets and an AMD Athlon XP processor seemingly have compatibility problems with the GeForce 6600 and 6800 GPUs. Problems that have been known to arise are freezing, artifacts, reboots, and other issues that make gaming and use of 3D applications almost impossible. These problems seem to happen only on Direct3D based applications and do not affect OpenGL.

=== GeForce 6 series comparison ===
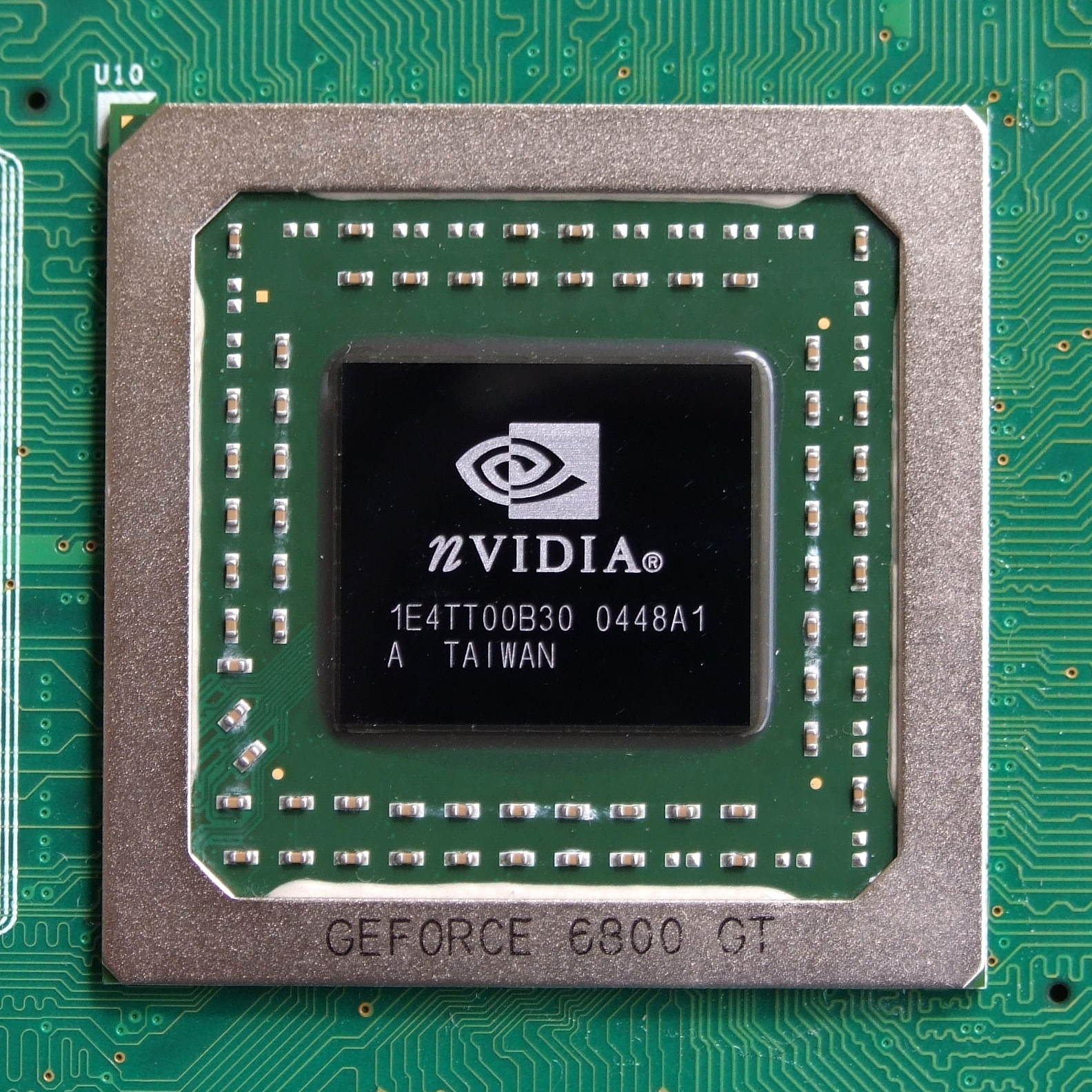
Nvidia NV40 GPU

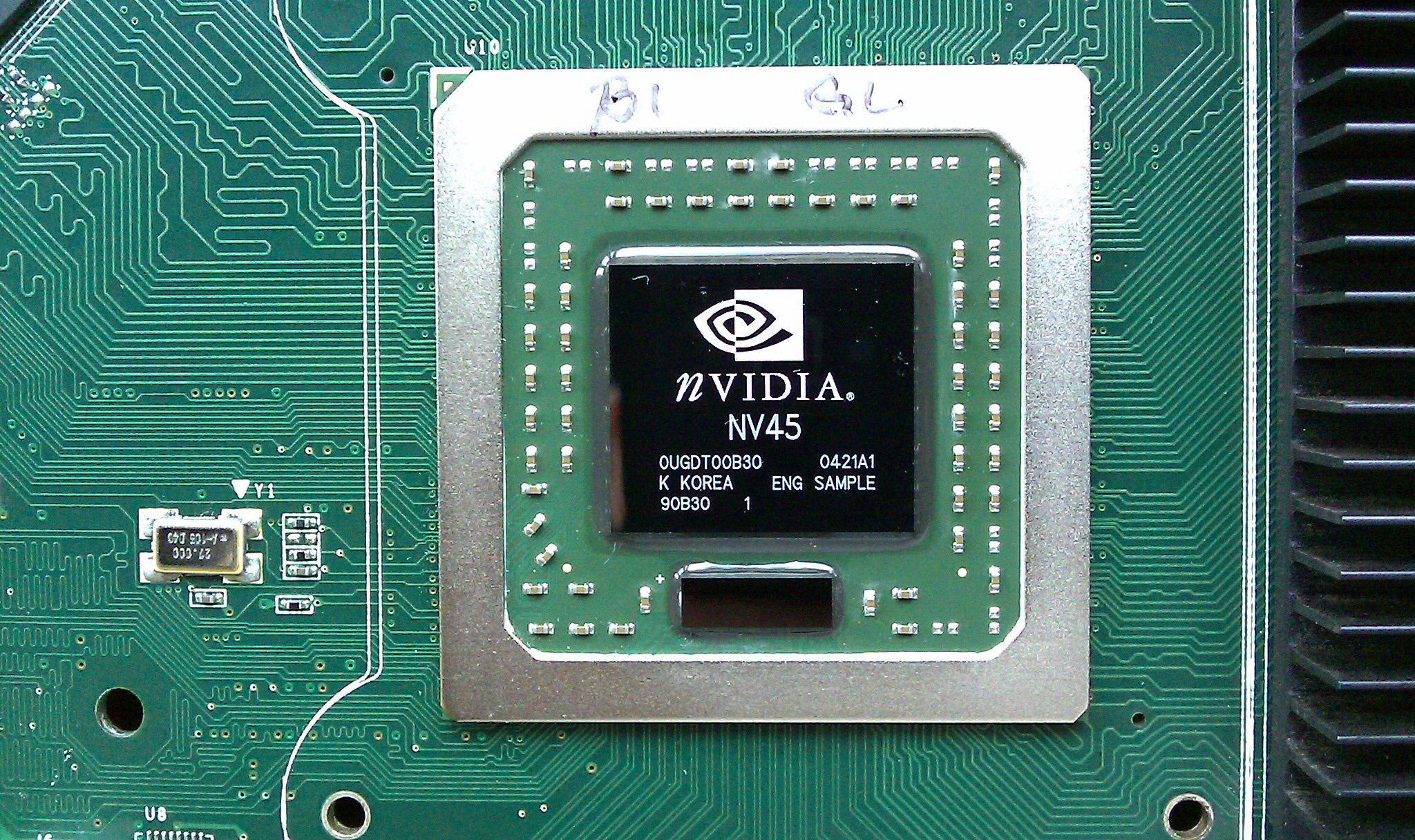
Nvidia NV45 GPU

Here is how the released versions of the "GeForce 6" series family compare to Nvidia's previous flagship GPU, the GeForce FX 5950 Ultra, in addition to the comparable units of ATI's newly released for the time Radeon X800 and X850 series:

	GeForce FX 5950 Ultra	GeForce 6200 TC-32	GeForce 6600 GT	GeForce 6800 Ultra	ATI Radeon X800 XT PE	ATI Radeon X850 XT PE
Transistor count	135 million	77 million	146 million	222 million	160 million	160 million
Manufacturing process	0.13 μm	0.11 μm	0.11 μm	0.13 μm	0.13 μm low-k	0.13 μm low-k
Die Area (mm²)	~200	110	156	288	288	297
Core clock speed (MHz)	475	350	500	400	520	540
Number of pixel shader processors	4	4	8	16	16	16
Number of pixel pipes	4	4	8	16	16	16
Number of texturing units	8(16*)	4	8	16	16	16
Number of vertex pipelines	3*	3	3	6	6	6
Peak pixel fill rate (theoretical)	1.9 Gigapixel/s	700 Megapixel/s	2.0 Gigapixel/s	6.4 Gigapixel/s	8.32 Gigapixel/s	8.64 Gigapixel/s
Peak texture fill rate (theoretical)	3.8 Gigatexel/s	1.4 Gigatexel/s	4.0 Gigatexel/s	6.4 Gigatexel/s	8.32 Gigatexel/s	8.64 Gigatexel/s
Memory interface	256-bit	64-bit	128-bit	256-bit	256-bit	256-bit
Memory clock speed	950 MHz DDR	700 MHz DDR2	1.0 GHz / 950 MHz** GDDR3	1.1 GHz GDDR3	1.12 GHz GDDR3	1.18 GHz GDDR3
Peak memory bandwidth (GiB/s)	30.4	5.6	16.0 / 14.4**	35.2	35.84	37.76

(*) GeForce FX series has an Array-based Vertex Shader.

(**) AGP 6600 GT variant.

== GeForce 6800 series ==
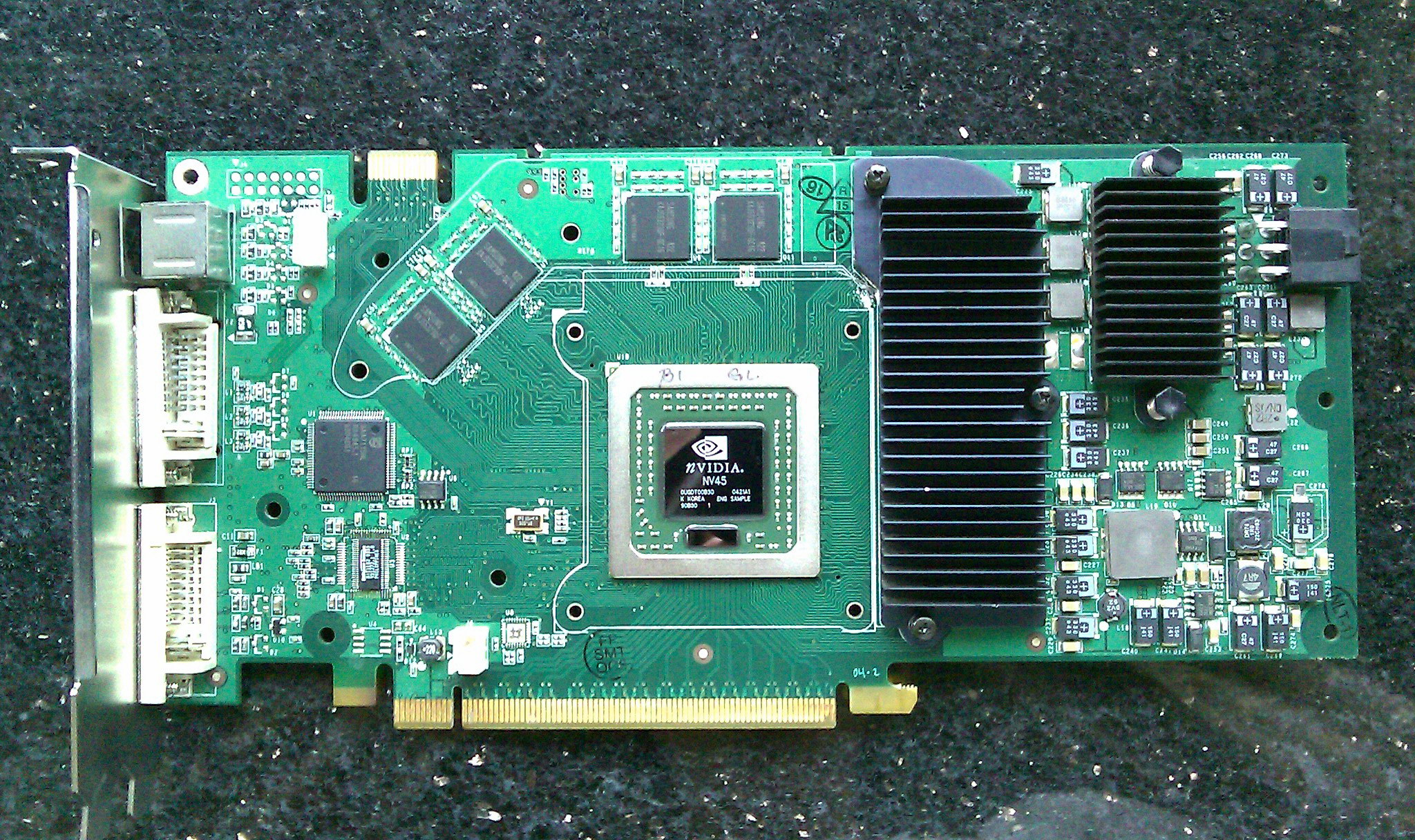
GeForce 6800 Ultra PCI-e 512MiB GDDR3

The first family in the GeForce 6 product-line, the 6800 series catered to the high-performance gaming market. As the very first GeForce 6 model, the 16 pixel pipeline GeForce 6800 Ultra (NV40) was 2 to 2.5 times faster than Nvidia's previous top-line product (the GeForce FX 5950 Ultra), packed four times the number of pixel pipelines, twice the number of texture units and added a much improved pixel-shader architecture. Yet, the 6800 Ultra was fabricated on the same (IBM) 130 nanometer process node as the FX 5950, and it consumed slightly less power. NV48 was a later version of NV40 manufactured in 110 nanometer process.

Like all of Nvidia's GPUs up until 2004, initial 6800 members were designed for the AGP bus. Nvidia added support for the PCI Express (PCIe) bus in later GeForce 6 products, usually by use of an AGP-PCIe bridge chip. In the case of the 6800 GT and 6800 Ultra, Nvidia developed a variant of the NV40 chip called the NV45. The NV45 shares the same die core as the NV40, but embeds an AGP-PCIe bridge on the chip's package. (Internally, the NV45 is an AGP NV40 with added bus-translation logic, to permit interfacing with a PCIe motherboard. Externally, the NV45 is a single package with two separate silicon dies clearly visible on the top.)

The use of an AGP-PCIe bridge chip initially led to fears that natively-AGP GPUs would not be able to take advantage of the additional bandwidth offered by PCIe and would therefore be at a disadvantage relative to native PCIe chips. However, benchmarking reveals that even AGP 4× is fast enough that most contemporary games do not improve significantly in performance when switched to AGP 8×, rendering the further bandwidth increase provided by PCIe largely superfluous. Additionally, Nvidia's on-board implementations of AGP are clocked at AGP 12× or 16×, providing bandwidth comparable to PCIe for the rare situations when this bandwidth is actually necessary.

The use of a bridge chip allowed Nvidia to release a full complement of PCIe graphics cards without having to redesign them for the PCIe interface. Later, when Nvidia's GPUs were designed to use PCIe natively, the bidirectional bridge chip allowed them to be used in AGP cards. ATI, initially a critic of the bridge chip, eventually designed a similar solution (known as Rialto) for their own cards.

Nvidia's professional Quadro line contains members drawn from the 6800 series: Quadro FX 4000 (AGP) and the Quadro FX 3400, 4400 and 4400g (both PCI Express). The 6800 series was also incorporated into laptops with the GeForce Go 6800 and Go 6800 Ultra GPUs.

=== PureVideo and the AGP GeForce 6800 ===
PureVideo expanded the level of multimedia-video support from decoding of MPEG-2 video to decoding of more advanced codecs (MPEG-4, WMV9), enhanced post-processing (advanced de-interlacing), and limited acceleration for encoding. But perhaps ironically, the first GeForce product(s) to offer PureVideo, the AGP GeForce 6800/GT/Ultra, failed to support all of PureVideo's advertised features.

Media player software (WMP9) with support for WMV-acceleration did not become available until several months after the 6800's introduction. User and web reports showed little if any difference between PureVideo enabled GeForces and non-Purevideo cards. The prolonged public silence of Nvidia, after promising updated drivers, and test benchmarks gathered by users led the user community to conclude that the WMV9 decoder component of the AGP 6800's PureVideo unit is either non-functional or intentionally disabled.

In late 2005, an update to Nvidia's website finally confirmed what had long been suspected by the user community: WMV-acceleration is not available on the AGP 6800.

Of course, today's computers are fast enough to play and decode WMV9 video and other sophisticated codecs like MPEG-4, H.264 or VP8 without hardware acceleration, thus negating the need for something like PureVideo.

=== GeForce 6 series general features ===
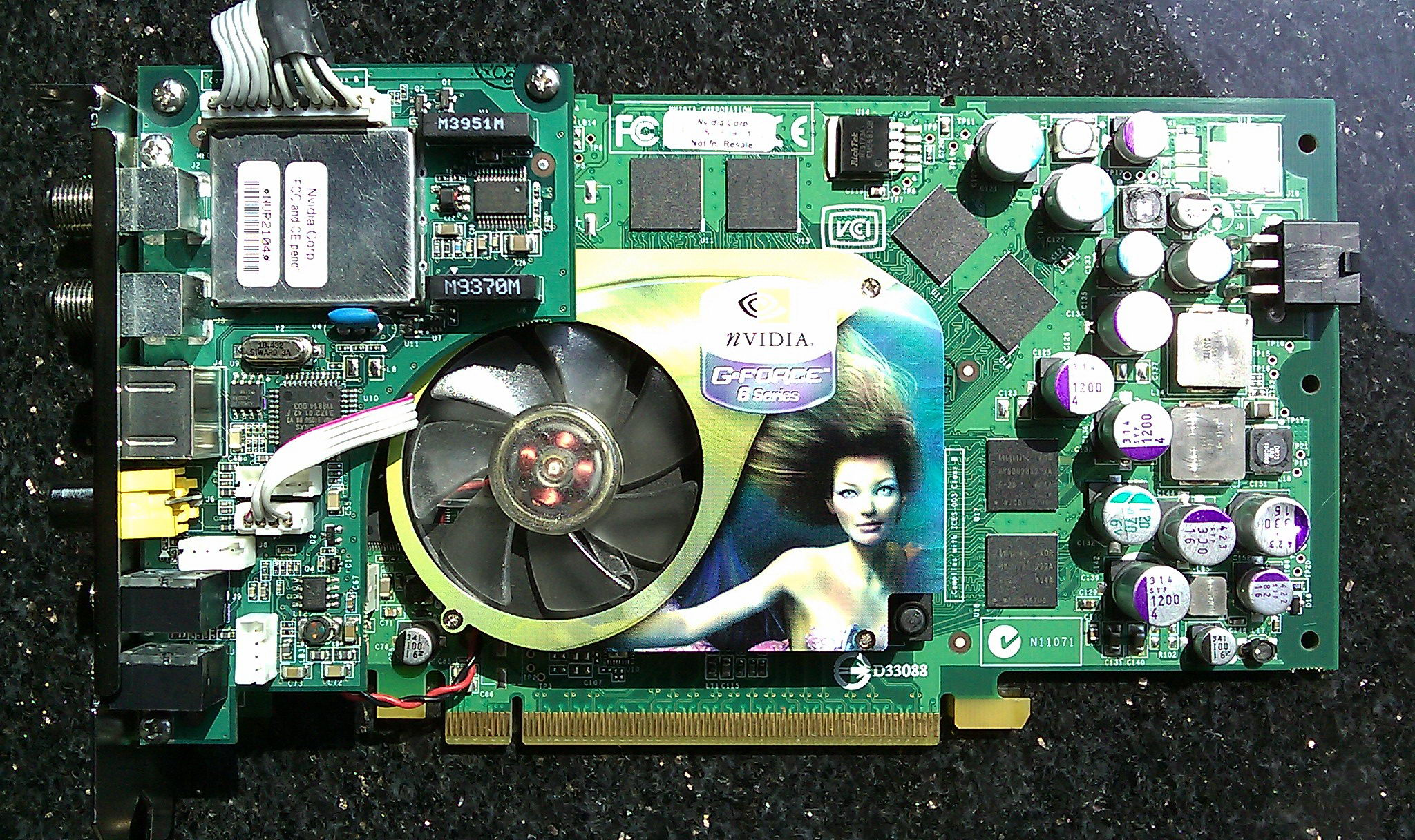
GeForce 6800 Personal Cinema

- 4, 8, 12, or 16 pixel-pipeline GPU architecture
- Up to 8x more shading performance compared to the previous generation
- CineFX 3.0 engine - DirectX 9 Shader Model 3.0 support
- On Chip Video processor (PureVideo)
- Full MPEG-2 encoding and decoding at GPU level (PureVideo)
- Advanced Adaptive De-Interlacing (PureVideo)
- DDR and GDDR-3 memory on a 256-bit wide Memory interface
- UltraShadow II technology - 3x to 4x faster than NV35 (GeForce FX 5900)
- High Precision Dynamic Range (HPDR) technology
- 128-bit studio precision through the entire pipeline - Floating-point 32-bit color precision
- IntelliSample 4.0 Technology - 16x Anisotropic Filtering, Rotating Grid Antialiasing and Transparency Antialiasing (see here)
- Maximum display resolution of 2048x1536@85 Hz
- Video Scaling and Filtering - HQ filtering techniques up to HDTV resolutions
- Integrated TV Encoder - TV-output up to 1024x768 resolutions
- OpenGL 2.0 Optimizations and support
- DVC 3.0 (Digital Vibrance Control)
- Dual 400 MHz RAMDACs which support QXGA displays up to 2048x1536 @ 85 Hz
- Dual DVI outputs on select members (implementation depends on the card manufacturer)

=== 6800 chipset table ===
Board Name	Core Type	Core (MHz)	Memory (MHz)	Pipeline Config	Vertex Processors	Memory Interface
6800 Ultra	NV40/NV45	400	550	16	6	256-bit
6800 GT	NV40/NV45/NV48	350	500	16	6	256-bit
6800 Ultra EE	NV40	450	600	16	6	256-bit
6800 GS PCIe	NV42	425	500	12	5	256-bit
6800 GS	NV40	350	500	12	5	256-bit
6800 GTO	NV40/NV45	350	450	12	5	256-bit
6800	NV40/NV41/NV42/NV48	325	300/350	12	5	256-bit
6800 Go	NV41M	300	300	12	5	256-bit
6800 Go Ultra	NV41M(0.13u)/NV42M(0.11u)	450	600	12	5	256-bit
6800 LE / XT	NV40/NV41/NV42/NV48	300/325	266/350	8	4	128/256-bit
6800 XE	NV40	275	266	8	3	128-bit

=== Notes ===
- The limited-supply GeForce 6800 Ultra Extreme Edition was shipped with a 450 MHz core clock and (usually) a 1200 MHz memory clock, but was otherwise identical to a common 6800 Ultra.
- The GeForce 6800 GS is cheaper to manufacture and has a lower MSRP than the GeForce 6800 GT because it has fewer pipelines and is fabricated on a smaller process (110 vs 130 nm), but performance is similar because it has a faster core clock. The AGP version, however, uses the original NV40 chip and 6800 GT circuit board and the inactive pixel and vertex pipelines may potentially be unlockable. However, the PCI Express version lacks them entirely, preventing such modifications.
- The 6800 GTO (which was produced only as an OEM card) contains four masked pixel pipelines and one masked vertex shader, which are potentially unlockable.
- The GeForce 6800 is often unofficially called the "GeForce 6800 Vanilla" or the "GeForce 6800 NU" (for Non-Ultra) to distinguish it from the other models. Recent PCIe variants have the NV41 (IBM 0.13 micrometre) or NV42 (TSMC 0.11 micrometer) cores, which are native PCIe implementations and do not have an integrated AGP bridge chip. The AGP version of the video card contains four masked pixel pipelines and one masked vertex shader, which are potentially unlockable through software mods. PCI-Express 6800 cards are incapable of such modifications, because the masked pixel pipelines and vertex buffers are nonexistent.
- The 6800 XT varies greatly depending on manufacturer. It is produced using three cores (NV40/NV41/NV42), four memory configurations (128 MiB DDR, 256 MiB DDR, 128 MiB GDDR3, 256 MiB GDDR3, and 512 MiB GDDR2), and has clock speeds ranging from 300 to 425 MHz (core) and 600-1000 MHz (memory). 6800 XT cards based on the NV40 core contain eight masked pixel pipelines and two masked vertex shaders, and those based on the NV42 core contain four masked pipelines and one masked shader (for some reason, the NV42 cards are almost never unlockable. It is speculated that the pipelines are being laser-cut).
- The 6800 LE contains eight masked pixel pipelines and two masked vertex shaders, which are potentially unlockable.
- The AGP version of the 6800 series does not have support for 2D acceleration in Adobe Reader/Acrobat 9.0 even though the GeForce AGP 6600, and PCI-e 6800 versions do.

== GeForce 6600 series ==
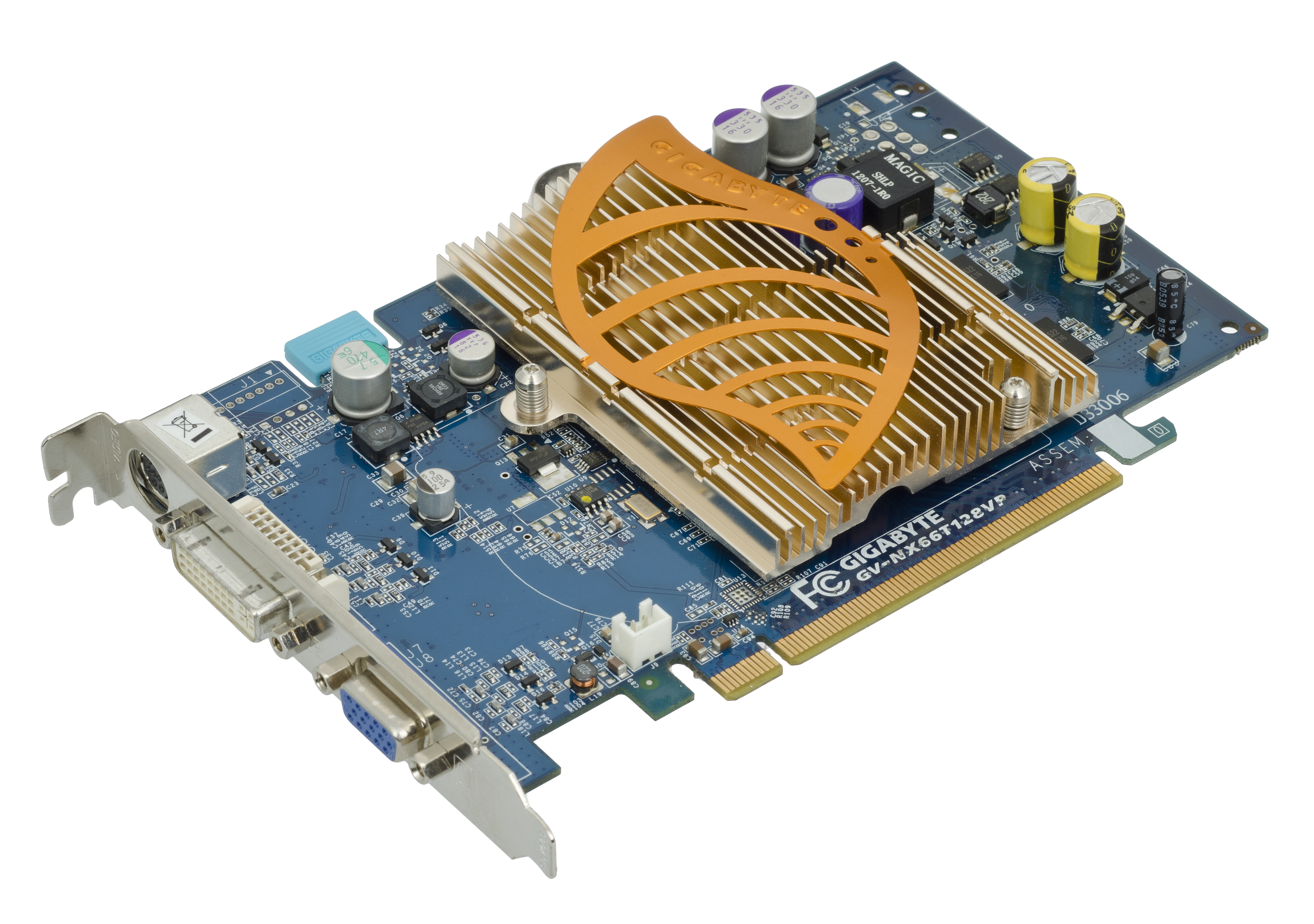
A Gigabyte 6600 GT PCI Express card

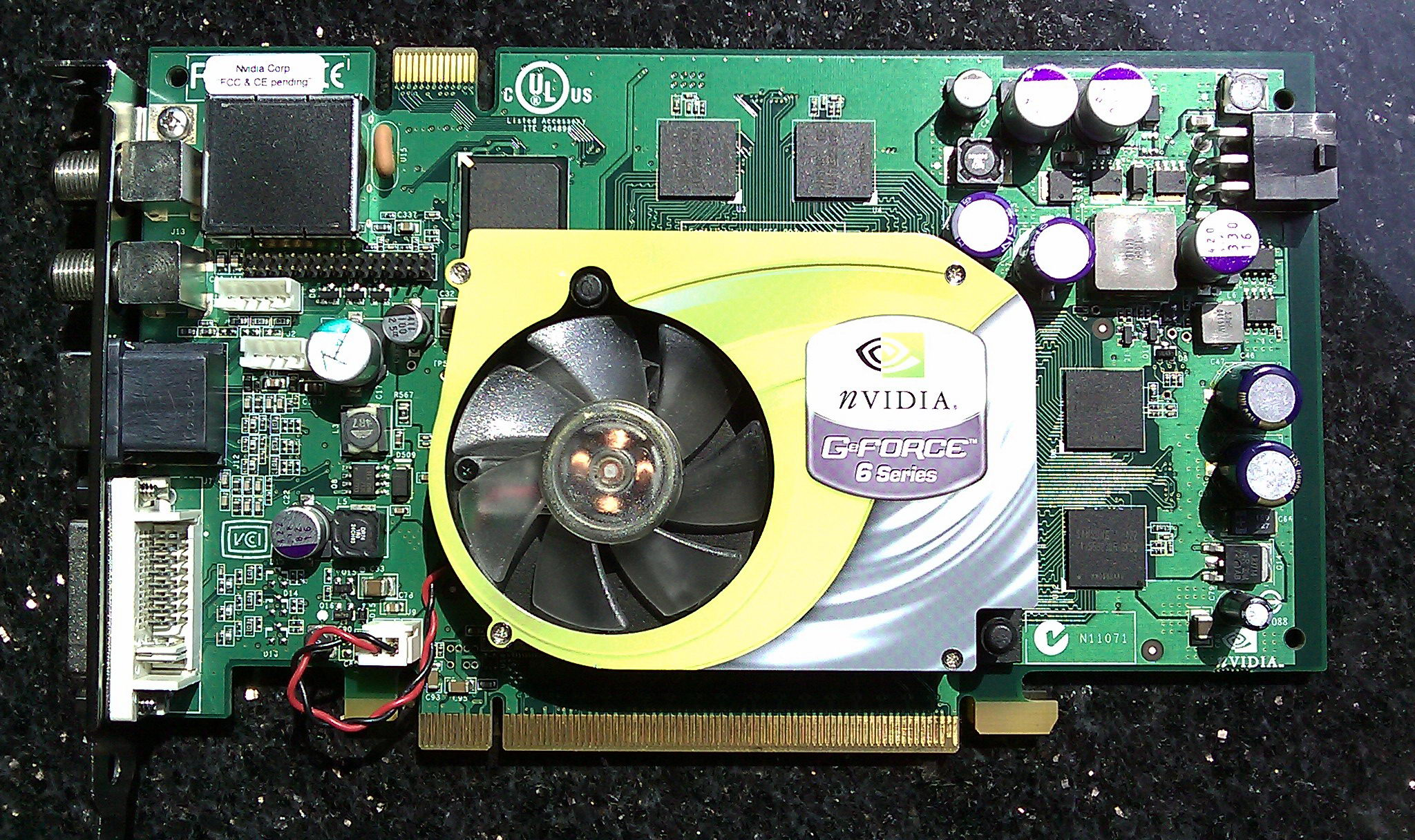
GeForce 6600 GT Personal Cinema

The GeForce 6600 (NV43) was officially launched on August 12, 2004, several months after the launch of the 6800 Ultra. With half the pixel pipelines and vertex shaders of the 6800 GT, and a smaller 128-bit memory bus, the lower-performance and lower-cost 6600 is the mainstream product of the GeForce 6 series. The 6600 series retains the core rendering features of the 6800 series, including SLI. Equipped with fewer rendering units, the 6600 series processes pixel data at a slower rate than the more powerful 6800 series. However, the reduction in hardware resources, and migration to TSMC's 110 nm manufacturing process (versus the 6800's 130 nm process), make the 6600 both less expensive for Nvidia to manufacture and less expensive for customers to purchase.

Their 6600 series currently has three variants: the GeForce 6600LE, the 6600, and the 6600GT (in order from slowest to fastest.) The 6600 GT performs quite a bit better than the GeForce FX 5950 Ultra or Radeon 9800 XT, with the 6600 GT scoring around 8000 in 3DMark03, while the GeForce FX 5950 Ultra scored around 6000, and it is also much cheaper. Notably, the 6600 GT offered identical performance to ATI's high-end X800 PRO graphics card with drivers previous December 2004, when running the popular game Doom 3. It was also about as fast as the higher-end GeForce 6800 when running games without anti-aliasing in most scenarios.

At introduction, the 6600 family was only available in PCI Express form. AGP models became available roughly a month later, through the use of Nvidia's AGP-PCIe bridge chip. A majority of the AGP GeForce 6600GTs have their memory clocked at 900 MHz, which is 100 MHz slower than the PCI-e cards, on which the memory operates at 1000 MHz. This can contribute to a performance decline when playing certain games. However, it was often possible to "overclock" the memory to its nominal frequency of 1000 MHz and there are AGP cards (for example from XFX) that use 1000 MHz by default.

=== 6600 chipset table ===
Board Name	Core Type	Core (MHz)	Memory (MHz)	Pipeline Config	Vertex Processors	Memory Interface
6700 XL	NV43	525	1100	8	3	128-bit
6600 GT GDDR3	NV43	500	900/1000	8	3	128-bit
6600 XL	NV43	400	800	8	3	128-bit
6600 DDR2	NV43	350	800	8	3	128-bit
6600	NV43	300	500/550	8	3	128-bit
6600 LE	NV43	300	500	4	3	128-bit

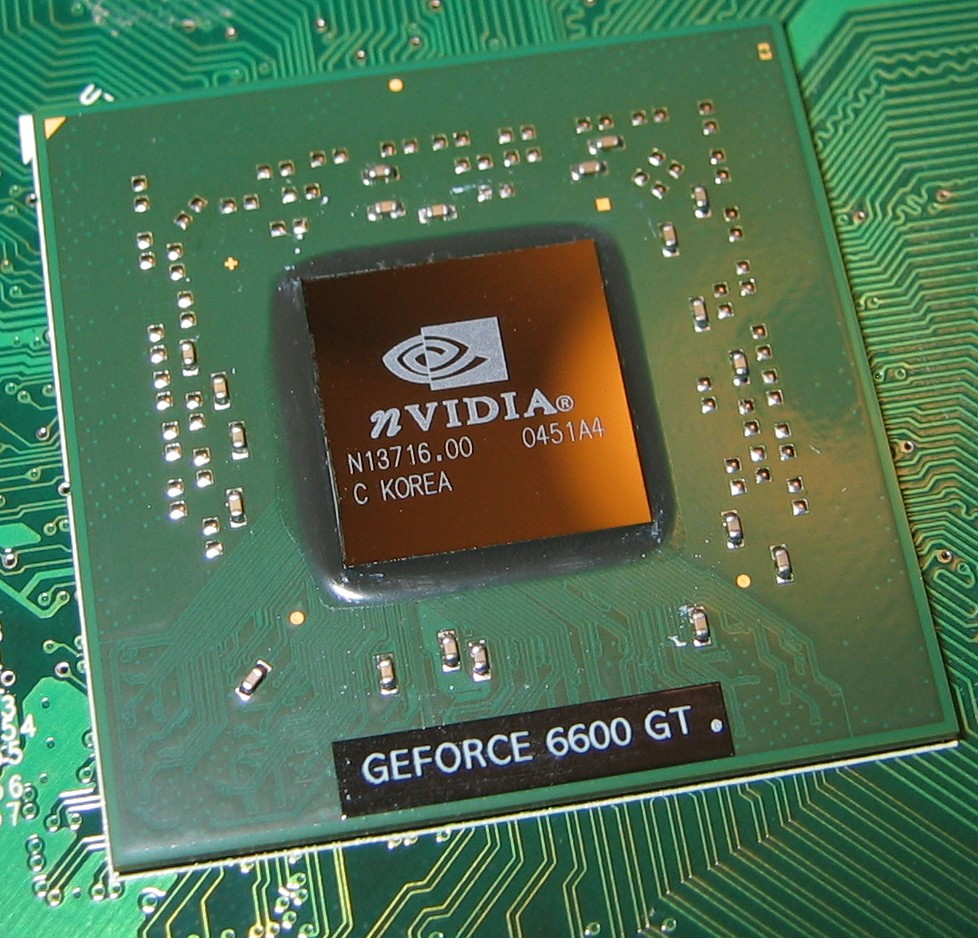
Nvidia NV43 GPU

Other data for PCI Express based cards:

- Memory Interface: 128-bit
- Memory Bandwidth: 16.0 GiB/s.
- Fill Rate (pixels/s.): 4.0 billion
- Vertices per Second: 375 million
- Memory Data Rate: 1000 MHz
- Pixels per Clock (peak): 8
- RAMDACs: 400 MHz

Other data for AGP based cards:

- Memory Interface: 128-bit
- Memory Bandwidth: 14.4 GiB/s.
- Fill Rate (pixels/s.): 4.0 billion
- Vertices per Second: 375 million
- Memory Data Rate: 900 MHz
- Pixels per Clock (peak): 8
- RAMDACs 400 MHz

== GeForce 6500 ==
The GeForce 6500 was released in October 2005 and is based on the same NV44 core as the value/budget (low-end or entry level) GeForce 6200TC, but with a higher GPU clock speed and more memory. The GeForce 6500 also supports SLI.

=== GeForce 6500 ===
- Core Clock: 450 MHz
- Memory Clock: 700 MHz
- Pixel Pipelines: 4
- Number of ROPs: 2
- Vertex Processors: 3
- Memory: 128/256 MiB DDR on a 64-bit interface
- Fill Rate (pixels/s): 1.6 billion
- Vertices per Second: 300 million
- Effective Memory Bandwidth (GiB/s): 13.44

== GeForce 6200 ==
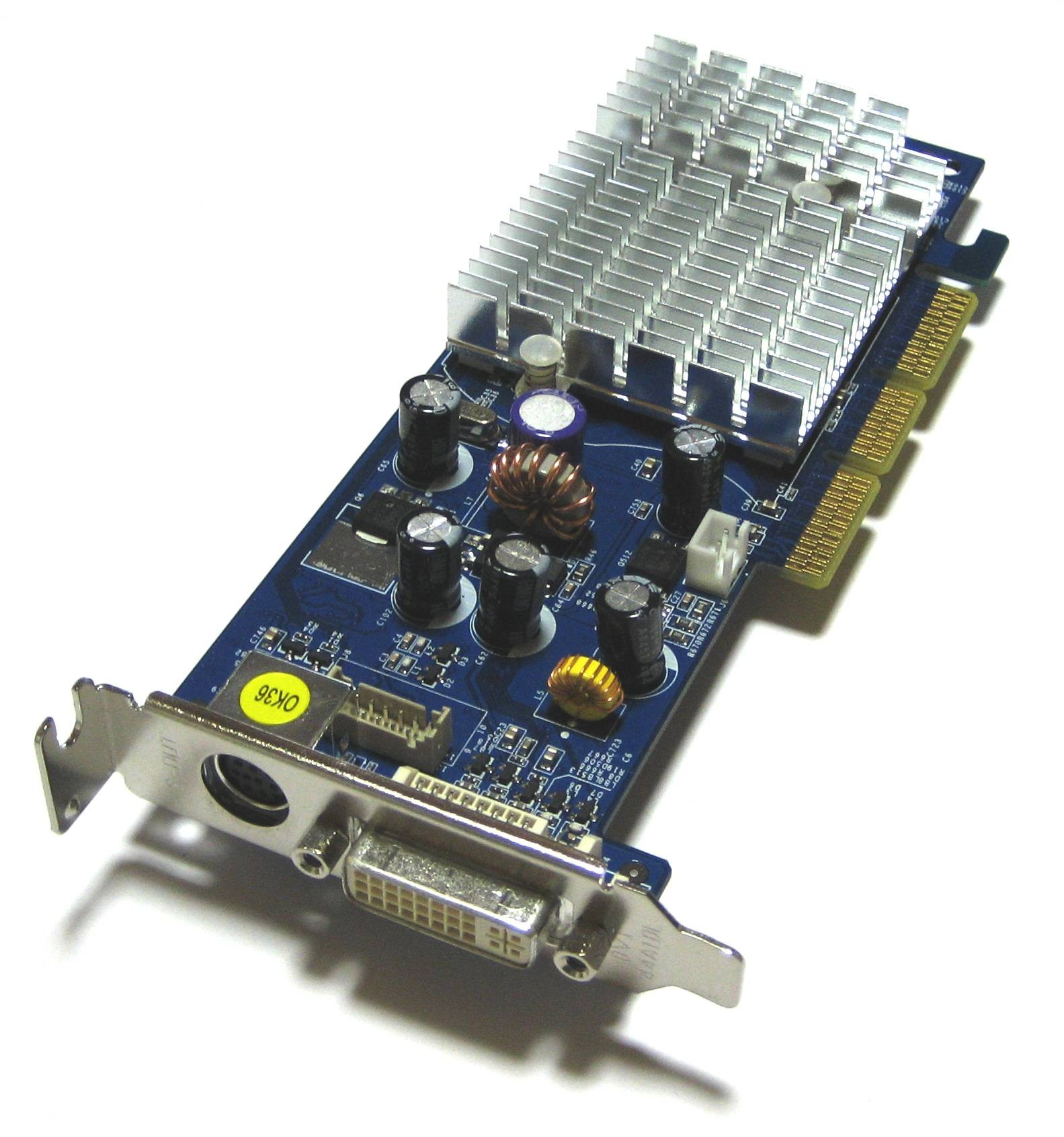
GeForce 6200 in a low-profile AGP form factor

With just 4 pixel pipelines, the 6200 series forms Nvidia's value/budget (low-end or entry level) product. The 6200 omits memory compression and SLI support, but otherwise offers similar rendering features as the 6600s. The later 6200 boards were based on the NV44 core(s), which is the final production silicon for the 6200 series. The 6200 is the only card in the series to feature keying for 3.3V AGP slots (barring some rare exceptions of higher-end cards from vendors like PNY).

However, at introduction, production silicon was not yet ready. Nvidia fulfilled 6200 orders by shipping binned/rejected 6600 series cores (NV43V). The rejects were factory-modified to disable four pixel pipelines, thereby converting the native 6600 product into a 6200 product. Some users were able to "unlock" early 6200 boards through a software utility (effectively converting the 6200 back into a 6600 with the complete set of eight pixel pipelines total) if they owned boards with an NV43 A2 or earlier revision of the core. Thus, not all NV43-based 6200 boards could successfully be unlocked (specifically those with a core revision of A4 or higher), and as soon as NV44 production silicon became available, Nvidia discontinued shipments of downgraded NV43V cores.

=== GeForce 6200 chip specifications ===
==== GeForce 6200 ====
- Core Clock: 300 MHz
- Memory Clock: 550 MHz
- Pixel Pipelines: 4
- Vertex Processors: 3
- Memory: 128/256/512 MiB DDR on a 64-bit/128-bit interface

== GeForce 6200 TurboCache / AGP ==
The GeForce 6200 TurboCache / AGP (NV44/NV44a) is a natively four-pipeline version of the NV43. GeForce 6200 TurboCache cards only have a very small (by modern standards) amount of memory, but attempt to make up for this by using system memory accessed through the PCI-Express bus.

=== GeForce 6200 TurboCache / AGP chip specifications ===
==== GeForce 6200 PCI-Express (NV44) TurboCache ====
- Core Clock: 350 MHz
- Memory Clock: 700 MHz
- Pixel Pipelines: 4
- Number of ROPs: 2
- Vertex Processors: 3
- Memory: 16/32/64/128 MiB DDR on a 32-bit/64-bit/128-bit interface
- GeForce 6200 w/ TurboCache supporting 128 MiB, including 16 MiB of local TurboCache (32-bit)
- GeForce 6200 w/ TurboCache supporting 128 MiB, including 32 MiB of local TurboCache (64-bit)
- GeForce 6200 w/ TurboCache supporting 256 MiB, including 64 MiB of local TurboCache (64-bit)
- GeForce 6200 w/ TurboCache supporting 256 MiB, including 128 MiB of local TurboCache (128-bit)

==== GeForce 6200 AGP (NV44a) without TurboCache ====
- Core Clock: 350 MHz
- Memory Clock: 500 MHz
- Pixel Pipelines: 4
- Number of ROPs: 2
- Vertex Processors: 3
- Memory: 128/256/512 MiB DDR or DDR2 on a 64-bit interface

==== GeForce 6200 AGP (NV44a2) without TurboCache ====
- Core Clock: 350 MHz
- Memory Clock: 540 MHz
- Pixel Pipelines: 4
- Number of ROPs: 2
- Vertex Processors: 3
- Memory: 128/256 MiB DDR2 with a 128-bit interface
- Cooling: Passive heatsink

==== GeForce 6200 PCI (NV44) without TurboCache ====
BFG Technologies originally introduced a unique PCI variant of the GeForce 6200 via its namesake B.F.G. and 3D Fuzion product lines. Subsequently, PNY (GeForce 6200 256 MiB PCI), SPARKLE Computer (GeForce 6200 128 MiB PCI and GeForce 6200 256 MiB PCI), and eVGA (e-GeForce 6200 256 MiB PCI and e-GeForce 6200 512 MiB PCI) released their own PCI versions of the GeForce 6200 featuring higher memory clocks and resultant memory bandwidth.

Until the release of the ATI X1300 PCI, these were the only PCI DirectX 9 capable cards not based on previous generation GeForce FX technology or discontinued XGI Technology Volari V3XT chipsets.

Excluding SPARKLE's GeForce 8400 and 8500 series, Zotac GT 610 cards and Club 3D HD 5450 cards in late 2012, the enhanced 512 MiB GeForce 6200 PCI variants remain among the most powerful PCI based systems available, making these cards desired by users lacking the option of upgrading to an AGP or PCI Express based discrete video card.

- Core Clock: 350 MHz
- Memory Clock: 400 MHz (BFG Technologies 6200 OC 410 MHz, PNY and EVGA 533 MHz)
- Pixel Pipelines: 4
- Memory: 512 (EVGA e-GeForce 6200 512 MiB PCI) / 256 (BFG Technologies 6200 OC PCI and EVGA e-Ge-Force 6200 PCI) / 128 (BFG Technologies 3DFuzion GeForce 6200 PCI) MiB DDR on a 64-bit interface

== GeForce 6100 and 6150 series ==
In late 2005 Nvidia introduced a new member to the GeForce family, the 6100 series, also known as C51. The term GeForce 6100/6150 actually refers to an nForce4-based motherboard with an integrated NV44 core, as opposed to a standalone graphics card. Nvidia released this product both to follow up its immensely popular GeForce4 MX based nForce and nForce2 boards and to compete with ATI's RS480/482 and Intel's GMA 900/950 in the integrated graphics space. The 6100 series is very competitive, usually tying with or just edging out the ATI products in most benchmarks.

The motherboards use two different types of southbridges - the nForce 410 and the nForce 430. They are fairly similar in features to the nForce4 Ultra motherboards that were on the market before them. Both feature PCI Express and PCI support, eight USB 2.0 ports, integrated sound, two Parallel ATA ports, and Serial ATA 3.0 Gibit/s with Native Command Queuing (NCQ) – two SATA ports in the case of the 410, four in the 430. The 430 southbridge also supports Gigabit Ethernet with Nvidia's ActiveArmor hardware firewall, while the 410 supports standard 10/100 Ethernet only.

=== GeForce 6100 and 6150 series chip specifications ===
Both the 6100 and 6150 support Shader Model 3.0 and DirectX 9.0c. The 6150 also features support for High-Definition video decoding of H.264/VC1/MPEG2, PureVideo Processing, DVI, and video-out. The 6100 only supports SD decoding of MPEG2/WMV9. Maximum supported resolution is 1920 × 1440 pixels (@75 Hz) for RGB display and 1600 × 1200 pixels (@65 Hz) for DVI-D display

=== GeForce 61XX abnormally high failure rate in notebook computers ===
In 2008, Nvidia took a $150 to 250M charge against revenue because the GPUs were failing at "higher than normal rates." HP provided an extension to their warranty of up to 24 months for notebooks affected by this issue. A class action suit was filed against HP and Nvidia by Whatley Drake & Kallas LLC.

==== GeForce 6100 ====
- Manufacturing process: 90 nm
- Core Clock: 425 MHz
- Vertex Processors: 1
- Pixel Pipelines: 2
- Shader Model: 3
- DirectX support: v9.0c
- Video playback acceleration: SD video acceleration of MPEG2/WMV9 (HD video acceleration not supported)
- Outputs: VGA only
- Memory: Shared DDR/DDR2 (socket 754/939/AM2) system memory (selectable through BIOS - usually 16/32/64/128/256 MiB)

==== GeForce 6150 ====
- Manufacturing process: 90 nm
- Core clock: 475 MHz
- Vertex processors: 1
- Pixel pipelines: 2
- Shader model: 3
- DirectX support: v9.0c
- Video playback acceleration: HD video acceleration of H.264/VC1/MPEG2
- Outputs: VGA, DVI, RCA (Video)
- Memory: Shared DDR2 (socket 939/AM2) system memory (selectable through BIOS - usually 16/32/64/128/256 MiB)
- HT Bus (Bandwidth) = 2000 MT/s max

==== GeForce 6150LE ====
The GeForce 6150LE was primarily featured in the 2006 lineup of the Nvidia Business Platform. The chip is used by Fujitsu-Siemens in its Esprimo green desktop, HP in its Pavilion Media Center a1547c Desktop PC and Compaq Presario SR1915 Desktop, and Dell in its Dimension C521 and E521 desktop PCs.

==== GeForce 6150SE ====
GeForce 6150SE (MCP61, also known as C61) is an updated, single-chip version of the Nvidia GeForce 6100. The MCP61 uses less power than the original C51 2-chip version of 6100. Its onboard video outperforms the 6150 in many 3D benchmarks despite its lower core frequency (425 MHz), because of added hardware Z-culling.

MCP61 introduced a bug in the SATA NCQ implementation. As a result, Nvidia employees have contributed code to disable NCQ operations under Linux.

- Manufacturing process: 90 nm
- Core Clock: 425 MHz
- HT Bus = 2000 MT/s max
- Vertex Processors: 1
- Pixel Pipelines: 2
- Shader Model: 3
- DirectX support: v9.0c
- Outputs: VGA only

== IntelliSample 4.0 and the GeForce 6 GPUs ==
Upon launch of the GeForce 7 family of graphics processing units, IntelliSample 4.0 was considered to be an exclusive feature of the GeForce 7 series of GPUs. However, version 91.47 (and subsequent versions) of the Nvidia ForceWare drivers enable the features of IntelliSample 4.0 on the GeForce 6 GPUs. IntelliSample 4.0 introduces two new antialiasing modes, known as Transparency Supersampling Antialiasing and Transparency Multisampling Antialiasing. These new antialiasing modes enhance the image quality of thin-lined objects such as fences, trees, vegetation and grass in various games.

One possible reason for the enabling of IntelliSample 4.0 for GeForce 6 GPUs might be the fact that the GeForce 7100 GS GPUs are based on NV44 chips, the same as the GeForce 6200 models. Because of this, Nvidia had to backport IntelliSample 4.0 features to the NV4x GPUs, and as a result, the entire GeForce 6 family is able to enjoy the benefits of Transparency Antialiasing.

It was already well known across various communities that Transparency Antialiasing could be used on GeForce 6 GPUs by using some third party tweak tools. As of Nvidia ForceWare drivers 175.16, GeForce 6 IntelliSample 4.0 support has been removed.

== GeForce 6 model information ==
- All models support Transparency AA (starting with version 91.47 of the ForceWare drivers) and PureVideo

Model	Launch	Code name	Fab (nm)	Transistors (million) Die size (mm^{2})	Bus interface	Core clock (MHz)	Memory clock (MHz)	Core config (Note: Pixel shaders: vertex shaders: texture mapping units: render output units)	Fillrate				Memory				Performance (GFLOPS)	TDP (Watts)
Model	Launch	Code name	Fab (nm)	Transistors (million) Die size (mm^{2})	Bus interface	Core clock (MHz)	Memory clock (MHz)	Core config	MOperations/s	MPixels/s	MTexels/s	MVertices/s	Size (MB)	Bandwidth (GB/s)	Bus type	Bus width (bit)	Performance (GFLOPS)	TDP (Watts)
GeForce 6100 + nForce 410	October 20, 2005	MCP51	TSMC 90 nm		HyperTransport	425	100–200 (DDR); 200–533 (DDR2)	2:1:2:1	850	425	850	106.25	Up to 256 system RAM	1.6–6.4 (DDR); 3.2–17.056 (DDR2)	DDR; DDR2	64; 128	?	?
GeForce 6150 SE + nForce 430	June 2006	MCP61	TSMC 90 nm		HyperTransport	425	200; 400	2:1:2:1	850	425	850	106.25	Up to 256 system RAM	3.2; 16.0	DDR2	64; 128	?	?
GeForce 6150 LE + nForce 430	June 2006	MCP61	TSMC 90 nm		HyperTransport	425	100–200 (DDR); 200–533 (DDR2)	2:1:2:1	850	425	850	106.25	Up to 256 system RAM	1.6–6.4 (DDR); 3.2–17.056 (DDR2)	DDR; DDR2	64; 128	?	?
GeForce 6150 + nForce 430	October 20, 2005	MCP51	TSMC 90 nm		HyperTransport	475	100–200 (DDR); 200–533 (DDR2)	2:1:2:1	950	475	950	118.75	Up to 256 system RAM	1.6–6.4 (DDR); 3.2–17.056 (DDR2)	DDR; DDR2	64; 128	?	?
GeForce 6200 LE	April 4, 2005	NV44	TSMC 110 nm	75; 110	AGP 8x PCIe x16	350	266	2:1:2:1	700	700	700	87.5	128; 256	4.256	DDR	64	?	?
GeForce 6200A	April 4, 2005	NV44A	TSMC 110 nm	75; 110	AGP 8x PCI	300 350	250 (DDR); 250-333 (DDR2)	4:3:4:2	1,400	700	1400	175; 225	128; 256; 512	4; 4-5.34 (DDR2)	DDR; DDR2	64	?	?
GeForce 6200	October 12, 2004 (PCIe); January 17, 2005 (AGP)	NV43	TSMC 110 nm	146; 154	AGP 8x PCI; PCIe x16	300	275	4:3:4:4	1,200	1,200	1,200	225	128; 256	8.8	DDR	128	1.2	20
GeForce 6200 TurboCache	December 15, 2004	NV44	TSMC 110 nm	75; 110	PCIe x16	350	200; 275; 350	4:3:4:2	1,400	700	1,400	262.5	128–256 System RAM incl.16/32–64/128 onboard	3.2; 4.4; 5.6	DDR	64	1.4	25
GeForce 6500	October 1, 2005	NV44	TSMC 110 nm	75; 110	PCIe x16	400	333	4:3:4:2	1,600	800	1,600	300	128; 256	5.328	DDR	64	?	?
GeForce 6600 LE	2005	NV43	TSMC 110 nm	146; 154	AGP 8x PCIe x16	300	200	4:3:4:4	1,200	1,200	1,200	225	128; 256	6.4	DDR	128	1.3	?
GeForce 6600	August 12, 2004	NV43	TSMC 110 nm	146; 154	AGP 8x PCIe x16	300	275; 400	8:3:8:4	2,400	1,200	2,400	225	128; 256	8.8; 12.8	DDR; DDR2	128	2.4	26
GeForce 6600 GT	August 12, 2004 (PCIe); November 14, 2004 (AGP)	NV43	TSMC 110 nm	146; 154	AGP 8x PCIe x16	500	475 (AGP); 500 (PCIe)	8:3:8:4	4,000	2,000	4,000	375	128; 256	15.2 (AGP); 16 (PCIe)	GDDR3	128	4.0	47
GeForce 6800 LE	July 22, 2004 (AGP); January 16, 2005 (PCIe)	NV40 (AGP); NV41, NV42 (PCIe)	IBM 130 nm	222; 287 (NV40); 222; 225 (NV41); 198; 222 (NV42)	AGP 8x PCIe x16	320 (AGP); 325 (PCIe)	350	8:4:8:8	2,560 (AGP); 2,600 (PCIe)	2,560 (AGP); 2,600 (PCIe)	2,560 (AGP); 2,600 (PCIe)	320 (AGP); 325 (PCIe)	128	22.4	DDR	256	2.6	?
GeForce 6800 XT	September 30, 2005	NV40 (AGP); NV41, NV42 (PCIe)	IBM 130 nm	222; 287 (NV40); 222; 225 (NV41); 198; 222 (NV42)	AGP 8x PCIe x16	300 (64 Bit); 325	266 (64 Bit); 350; 500 (GDDR3)	8:4:8:8	2,400; 2,600	2,400; 2,600	2,400; 2,600	300; 325	256	4.256; 11.2; 22.4; 32 (GDDR3)	DDR; DDR2; GDDR3	64; 128; 256	2.6	36
GeForce 6800	April 14, 2004 (AGP); November 8, 2004 (PCIe)	NV40 (AGP); NV41, NV42 (PCIe)	IBM 130 nm	222; 287 (NV40); 222; 225 (NV41); 198; 222 (NV42)	AGP 8x PCIe x16	325	350	12:5:12:12	3,900	3,900	3,900	406.25	128; 256	22.4	DDR	256	3.9	40
GeForce 6800 GTO	April 14, 2004	NV45	IBM 130 nm	222; 287 (NV45)	PCIe x16		450	12:5:12:12	4,200	4,200	4,200	437.5	256	28.8	GDDR3	256	?	?
GeForce 6800 GS	December 8, 2005 (AGP); November 7, 2005 (PCIe)	NV40 (AGP); NV42 (PCIe)	TSMC 110 nm	222; 287 (NV40); 198; 222 (NV42)	AGP 8x PCIe x16	350 (AGP); 425 (PCIe)	500	12:5:12:12	5,100	5,100	5,100	531.25	128; 256	32	GDDR3	256	4.2; 5.1	59
GeForce 6800 GT	May 4, 2004 (AGP); June 28, 2004 (PCIe)	NV40 (AGP); NV45 (PCIe)	IBM 130 nm	222; 287 (NV40); 222; 287 (NV45)	AGP 8x PCIe x16	350	500	16:6:16:16	5,600	5,600	5,600	525	128; 256	32	GDDR3	256	5.6	67
GeForce 6800 Ultra	May 4, 2004 (AGP); June 28, 2004 (PCIe); March 14, 2005 (512 MB)	NV40 (AGP); NV45 (PCIe)	IBM 130 nm	222; 287 (NV40); 222; 287 (NV45)	AGP 8x PCIe x16	400	525 (512 MB); 550 (256 MB)	16:6:16:16	6,400	6,400	6,400	600	256; 512	33.6 (512 MB); 35.2 (256 MB)	GDDR3	256	6.4	105
GeForce 6800 Ultra Extreme Edition	May 4, 2004	NV40	IBM 130 nm	222; 287 (NV40)	AGP 8x	450	600	16:6:16:16	7,200	7,200	7,200	675	256	35.2	GDDR3	256	?	?
Model	Launch	Code name	Fab (nm)	Transistors (million) Die size (mm^{2})	Bus interface	Core clock (MHz)	Memory clock (MHz)	Core config	Fillrate				Memory				Performance (GFLOPS)	TDP (Watts)
Model	Launch	Code name	Fab (nm)	Transistors (million) Die size (mm^{2})	Bus interface	Core clock (MHz)	Memory clock (MHz)	Core config	MOperations/s	MPixels/s	MTexels/s	MVertices/s	Size (MB)	Bandwidth (GB/s)	Bus type	Bus width (bit)	Performance (GFLOPS)	TDP (Watts)

=== Features ===
Model	Features			
Model	OpenEXR HDR	Scalable Link Interface (SLI)	TurboCache	PureVideo WMV9 Decoding
GeForce 6100	No	No	No	Limited
GeForce 6150 SE	No	No	Driver-Side Only	Limited
GeForce 6150	No	No	No	Yes
GeForce 6150 LE	No	No	Driver-Side Only	Yes
GeForce 6200	No	No	Yes (PCIe only)	Yes
GeForce 6500	No	Yes	Yes	Yes
GeForce 6600 LE	Yes	Yes (No SLI Connector)	No	Yes
GeForce 6600	Yes	Yes (SLI Connector or PCIe Interface)	No	Yes
GeForce 6600 DDR2	Yes	Yes (SLI Connector or PCIe Interface)	No	Yes
GeForce 6600 GT	Yes	Yes	No	Yes
GeForce 6800 LE	Yes	No	No	No
GeForce 6800 XT	Yes	Yes (PCIe only)	No	Yes (NV42 only)
GeForce 6800	Yes	Yes (PCIe only)	No	Yes (NV41, NV42 only)
GeForce 6800 GTO	Yes	Yes	No	No
GeForce 6800 GS	Yes	Yes (PCIe only)	No	Yes (NV42 only)
GeForce 6800 GT	Yes	Yes (PCIe only)	No	No
GeForce 6800 Ultra	Yes	Yes (PCIe only)	No	No

=== GeForce Go 6 (Go 6xxx) series ===
Model	Launch	Code name	Fab (nm)	Bus interface	Core clock (MHz)	Memory clock (MHz)	Core config^{1}	Fillrate				Memory			
Model	Launch	Code name	Fab (nm)	Bus interface	Core clock (MHz)	Memory clock (MHz)	Core config^{1}	MOperations/s	MPixels/s	MTexels/s	MVertices/s	Size (MB)	Bandwidth (GB/s)	Bus type	Bus width (bit)
GeForce Go 6100 + nForce Go 430	Unknown	C51M	110	HyperTransport	425	System memory	2:1:2:1	850	425	850	106.25	Up to 128 MB system	System memory	DDR2	64/128
GeForce Go 6150 + nForce Go 430	February 1, 2006	C51M	110	HyperTransport	425	System memory	2:1:2:1	850	425	850	106.25	Up to 128 MB system	System memory	DDR2	64/128
GeForce Go 6200	February 1, 2006	NV44M	110	PCIe x16	300	600	4:3:4:2	1200	600	1200	225	16	2.4	DDR	32
GeForce Go 6400	February 1, 2006	NV44M	110	PCIe x16	400	700	4:3:4:2	1600	800	1600	250	16	5.6	DDR	64
GeForce Go 6600	September 29, 2005	NV43M	110	PCIe x16	300	700	8:3:8:4	3000	1500	3000	281.25	128	11.2	DDR	128
GeForce Go 6800	November 8, 2004	NV41M	130	PCIe x16	300	700; 1100	12:5:12:12	3000	1500	3000	375	128	22.4; 35.2	DDR, DDR2; DDR3	256
GeForce Go 6800 Ultra	February 24, 2005	NV41M	130	PCIe x16	450	700; 1100	12:5:12:12	5400	3600	5400	562.5	256	22.4; 35.2	DDR, DDR2; DDR3	256

- ^{1} Pixel shaders: vertex shaders: texture mapping units: render output units

== Support ==
Nvidia has ceased driver support for GeForce 6 series.

=== Final drivers ===
The GeForce 6 series is the last to support the Windows 9x family of operating systems, as well as Windows NT 4.0. The successor GeForce 7 series only supports Windows 2000 and later (the Windows 8 drivers also support Windows 10).

- Windows 95: 66.94 released on December 16, 2004; Download
- Windows NT 4.0: 77.72 released on June 22, 2005; Download
- Windows 98 & Me: 81.98 released on December 21, 2005; Download

- Note: Though the installer for the driver states that it is compatible with Windows 95 as well as Windows 98/Me, it does not.

- Windows 2000: 94.24 released on May 17, 2006; Download
- Windows XP 32-bit & Media Center Edition: 307.83 released on February 25, 2013; Download
- Windows XP 64-bit: 307.83 released on February 25, 2013; Download
- Windows Vista, 7 & 8 32-bit: 309.08 released on February 24, 2015; Download
- Windows Vista, 7 & 8 64-bit: 309.08 released on February 24, 2015; Download

The drivers for Windows 2000/XP can also be installed on later versions of Windows such as Windows Vista and 7; however, they do not support desktop compositing or the Aero effects of these operating systems.

(Products supported list also on this page)

Windows 95/98/Me Driver Archive
Windows XP/2000 Driver Archive

== See also ==
- Comparison of Nvidia graphics processing units
- Curie (microarchitecture)
- GeForce FX series
- GeForce 7 series
- Scalable Link Interface
