= RSX =

RSX may refer to:

== Computing ==
- RSX, a RISC CPU from Encore Computer
- RSX-11, an operating system family developed by Digital Equipment Corporation
- RSX 'Reality Synthesizer', a graphics chip for the PS3
- Resident System Extension, part of the CP/M Plus operating system

== Other uses ==
- Acura RSX, an automobile manufactured by Honda Motor Co.
- Rhein-Sieg-Express, a German regional train service
- RS:X (sailboard)
- RSX Energy, a Canadian oil and gas company
- Label for an X-ray observation made by ROSAT
