= GeForce 7 series =

Series of GPUs by Nvidia

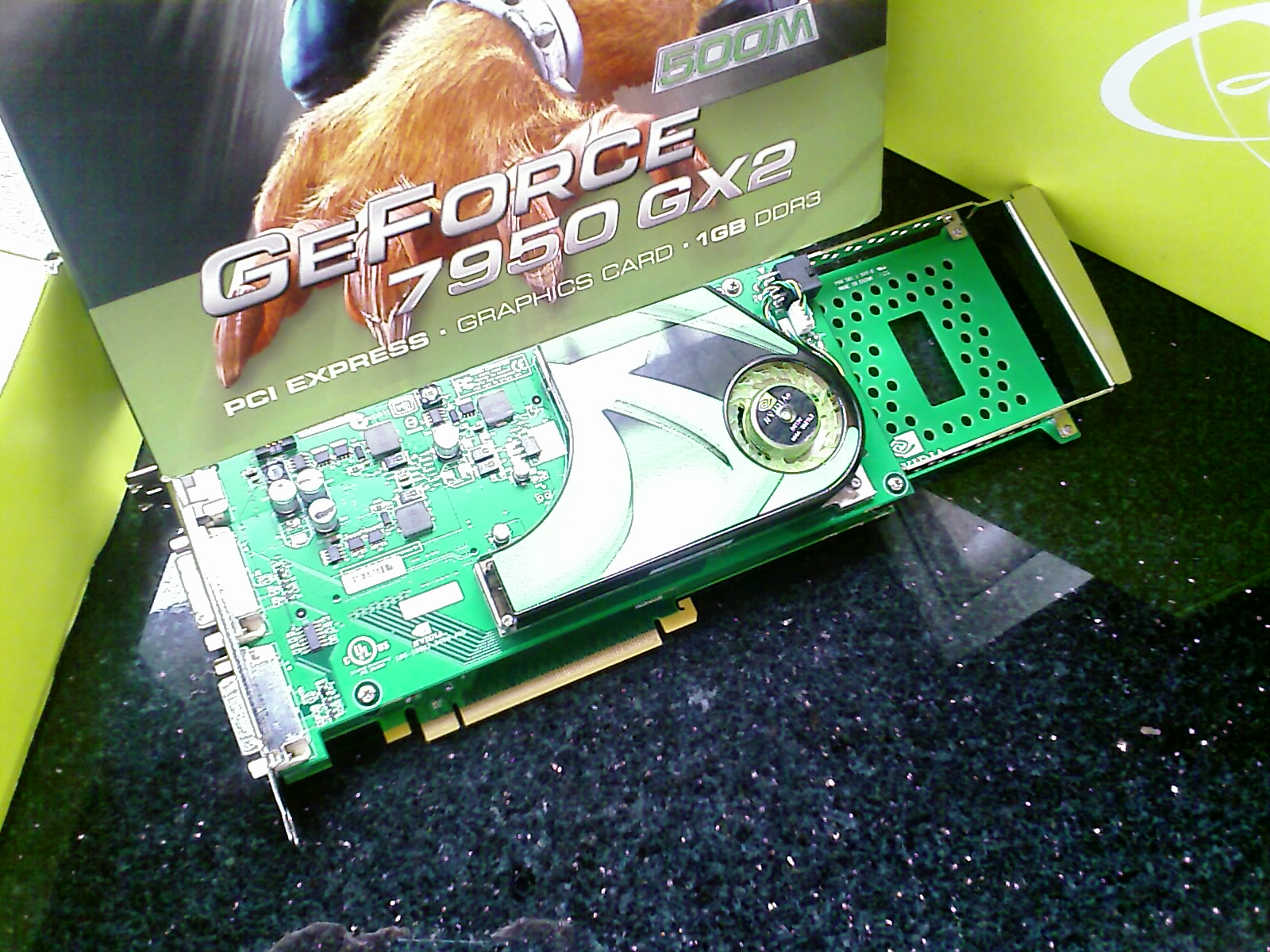
- Top: Logo of the series Bottom: A Nvidia GeForce 7950 GX2 released in 2006, the series' flagship model
- Release date: June 22, 2005; 21 years ago
- Codename: G7x, NV47
- Architecture: Curie
- Models: GeForce nForce series: GeForce SE series; GeForce LE series; GeForce GS series; GeForce GT series; GeForce GTO series; GeForce GTX series; GeForce GX2 series

Cards
- Entry-level: 7025; 7050; 7100; 7150; 7200; 7300; 7350; 7500
- Mid-range: 7600; 7650
- High-end: 7800
- Enthusiast: 7900; 7950

API support
- Direct3D: Direct3D 9.0c Shader Model 3.0
- OpenGL: OpenGL 2.1

History
- Predecessor: GeForce 6 series
- Successor: GeForce 8 series

Support status
- Unsupported

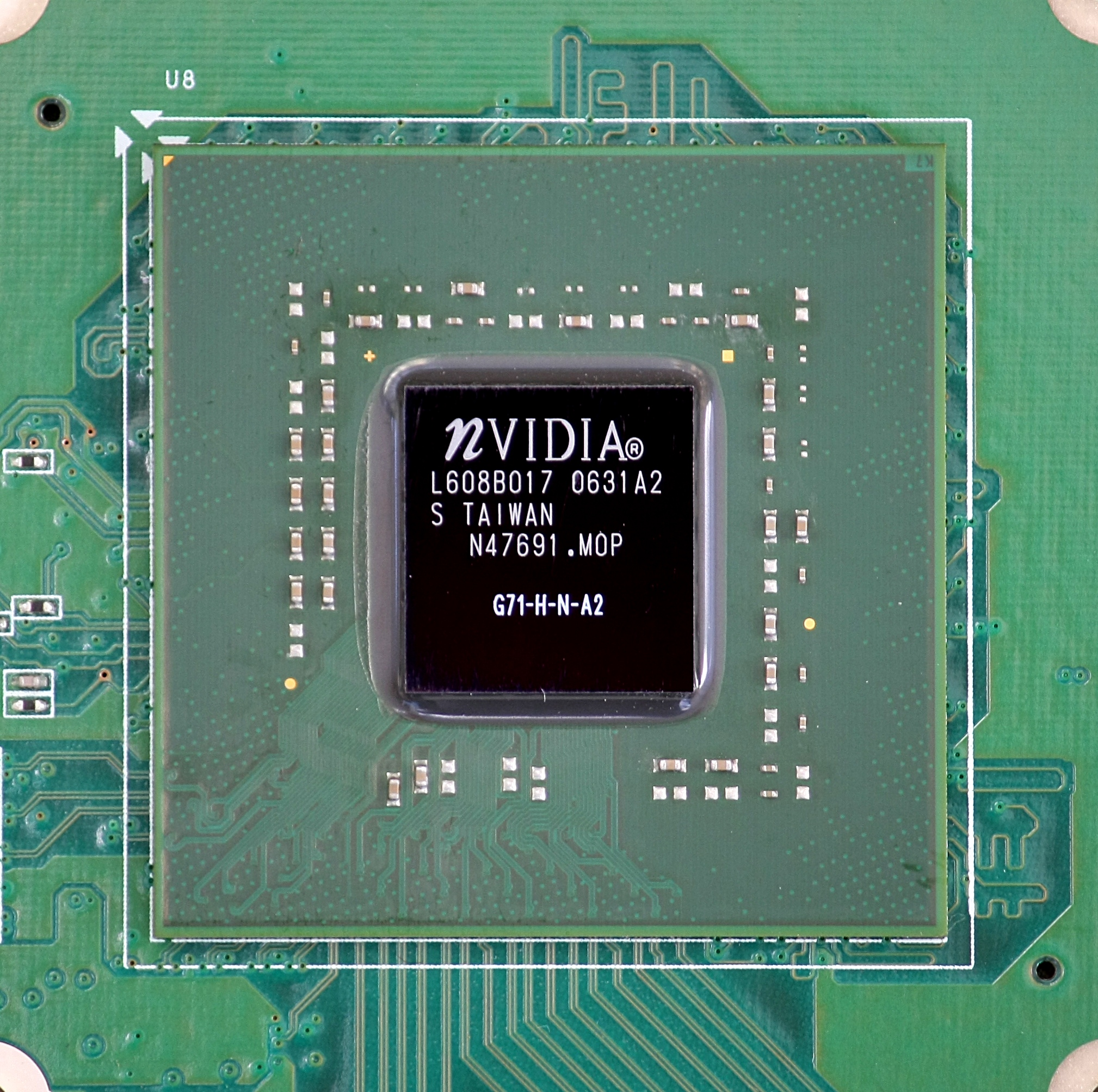
GPU Nvidia G71

The GeForce 7 series is the seventh generation of Nvidia's GeForce line of graphics processing units. This was the last series available on AGP cards.

== Features ==
The following features are common to all models in the GeForce 7 series except the GeForce 7100, which lacks GCAA(Gamma Corrected Anti-Aliasing):

- Intellisample 4.0
- Scalable Link Interface (SLI)
- TurboCache
- Nvidia PureVideo

The GeForce 7 supports hardware acceleration for H.264, but this feature was not used on Windows by Adobe Flash Player until the GeForce 8 series.

== GeForce 7100 series ==
The 7100 series was introduced on August 30, 2006 and is based on GeForce 6200 series architecture. This series supports only PCI Express interface. Only one model, the 7100 GS, is available.

Features

The 7100 series supports all of the standard features common to the GeForce 7 series provided it is using the ForceWare 91.47 driver or later releases, though it lacks OpenCL/CUDA support, and its implementation of IntelliSample 4.0 lacks GCAA.

The 7100 series does not support technologies such as high-dynamic-range rendering (HDR) and UltraShadow II.

=== GeForce 7100 GS ===
Although the 7300 LE was originally intended to be the "lowest budget" GPU from the GeForce 7 lineup, the 7100 GS has taken its place. As it is little more than a revamped version of the GeForce 6200TC, it is designed as a basic PCI-e solution for OEMs to use if the chipset does not have integrated video capabilities. It comes in a PCI Express Graphics Bus and up to 512MB DDR2 VRAM.

Performance specifications:

- Graphics Bus: PCI Express
- Memory Interface: 64-bits
- Memory Bandwidth: 5.3 GB/s
- Fill Rate: 1.4 billion pixel/s
- Vertex/s: 263 million
- Memory Type: DDR2 with TC

== GeForce 7200 series ==
The 7200 series was introduced October 8, 2006 and is based on (G72) architecture. It is designed to offer a low-cost upgrade from integrated graphics solutions. This series supports only PCI Express interface. Only one model, the 7200 GS, is available.

Features

In addition to the standard GeForce 7 series features, the 7200 series supports the following features:

- High dynamic range rendering
- UltraShadow II
- CineFX 4.0 Engine

The 7200 series does not support Scalable Link Interface (SLI).

=== GeForce 7200 GS ===
The 7200 GS has the same memory speed as the 7300 GS, and the core frequency is the same as the 7300 LE. It has two pixel pipelines. Nvidia stated that the 7200 GS performance is 50% higher than the latest integrated graphics, it's the slowest card of the GeForce 7 series and of the GeForce 6 Series but supports HDR and Nvidia PureVideo. NVIDIA GeForce 7200 GS desktop Graphics Processing Unit was launched in January 2006. The GPU uses Second Generation CineFX Shading architecture, and it is manufactured on 90 nm technological process. The card's graphics frequency is 450 MHz. It also has 2 pixel shaders, 4 texture units, together with 2 ROPs. The GeForce 7200 GS embeds 256 MB of DDR2 memory, utilizing 64 bit bus. The memory is clocked at 400 MHz, which results in 6.4 GB/s memory bandwidth. The GPU supports PCI Express 1.0 interface, and needs a single motherboard slot.

== GeForce 7300 series ==
Nvidia designed the 7300 series to be entry level gaming video cards. Four models were available: the 7300 GT, the 7300 GS, the 7300 LE, and the 7300 SE.

This series was released to replace the older Geforce 6200 series.

Features

In addition to the standard GeForce 7 series features, the 7300 series supports following advanced features:

- High dynamic range rendering
- UltraShadow II
- CineFX 4.0 Engine

=== GeForce 7300 SE ===
The 7300 SE uses the same core frequency and memory speed as the 7300 LE, and has two vertex and pixel shaders. In many ways, this card is actually inferior to the 7100 GS, although it still retains the HDR support.

=== GeForce 7300 LE ===
The 7300 LE (LE stands for light edition) is a scaled-down version of the 7300 GS. It has DDR2 memory, and a slightly lower core clock speed (450 MHz vs. 550 MHz). It is only available in the PCI Express interface. ASUS have produced a 7300 series card based on the 7300 LE core, running it at 580 MHz rather than 450 MHz.

=== GeForce 7300 GS ===
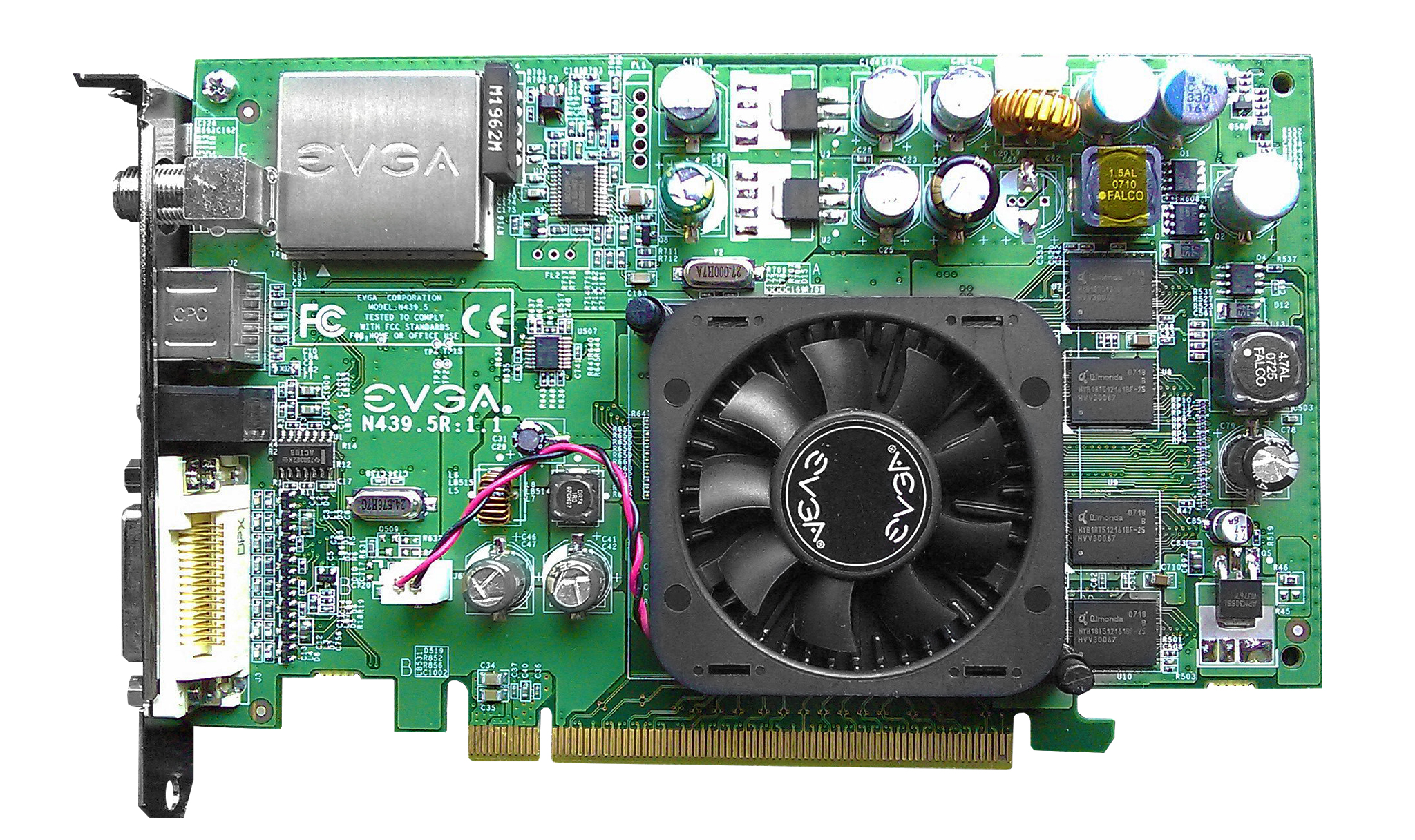
EVGA GeForce 7300 GS Personal Cinema

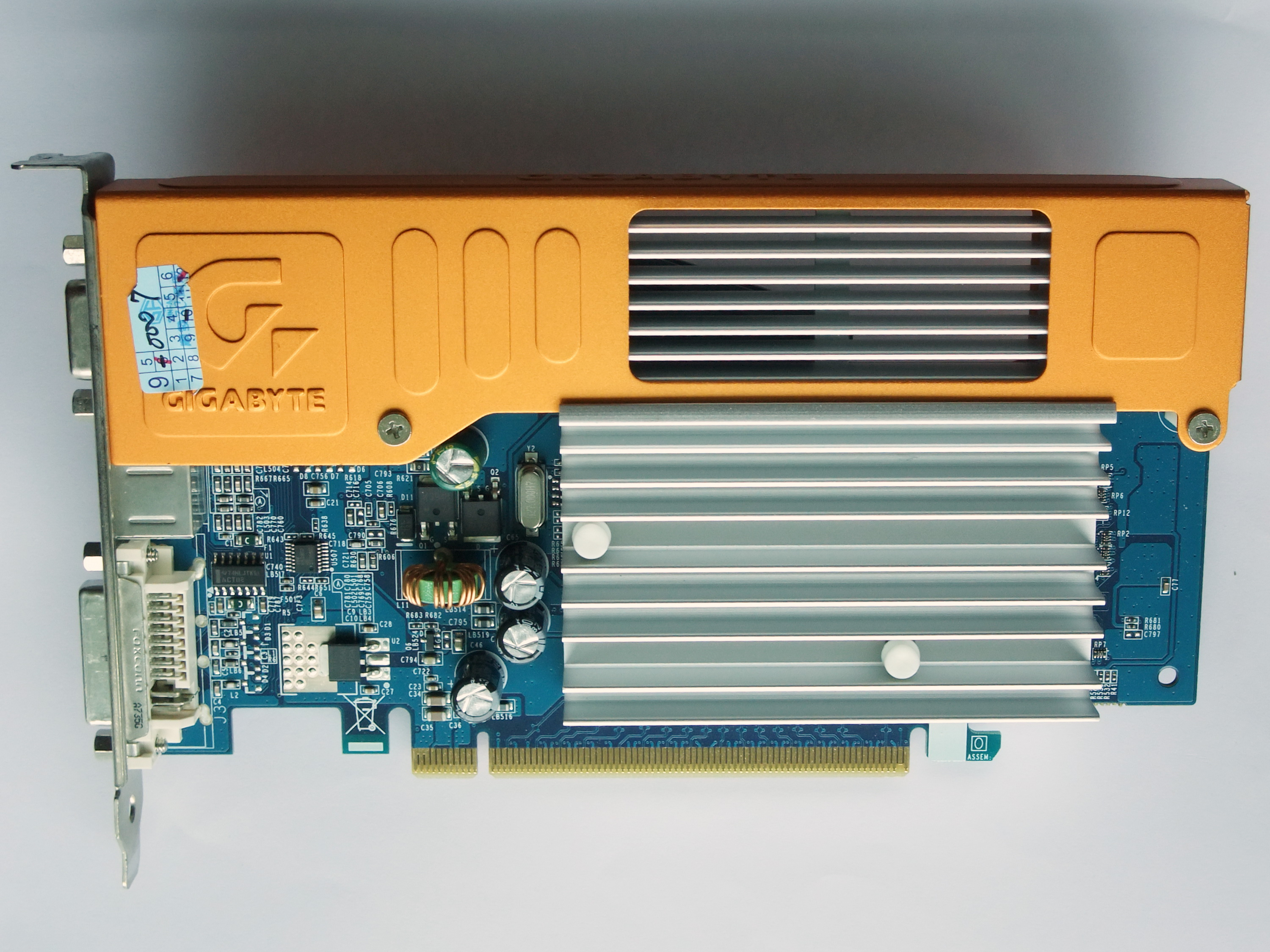
Gigabyte GeForce 7300 GS

The 7300 GS the highest core clock speed of the 7300 series, thus it has better performance than the 7300 SE/LE.

=== GeForce 7300 GT ===
The 7300 GT has a 128-bit memory interface and the highest memory bandwidth, but slightly lower 3D vertex rendering.

== GeForce 7500 series ==
The 7500 series was only available to OEMs.

== GeForce 7500 LE ==
The GeForce 7500 LE is an OEM GPU and is identical to the 7300 GS based on the G72 core. It has either 128 MB or 256 MB of dedicated video memory, however it also supports TurboCache, giving it up to 512 MB of video memory. It has DDR2 type memory and uses 64-bits memory interface. The card also has 550 MHz core clock speed and 263 MHz or 324 MHz memory clock speed (526 MHz or 648 MHz effective).

== GeForce 7600 series ==
Nvidia announced immediate availability of the GeForce 7600 series on March 9, 2006. Two models were made available, which were the GeForce 7600 GT and 7600 GS. This series was available with AGP and PCI-Express interfaces, covering a wide range of market segments.

This series was released to replace the older GeForce 6600 series.

Features

In addition to the standard GeForce 7 series features, the 7600 series supports following advanced features:

- High dynamic range rendering
- UltraShadow II
- CineFX 4.0 Engine
- Extreme HD

=== GeForce 7600 GS ===
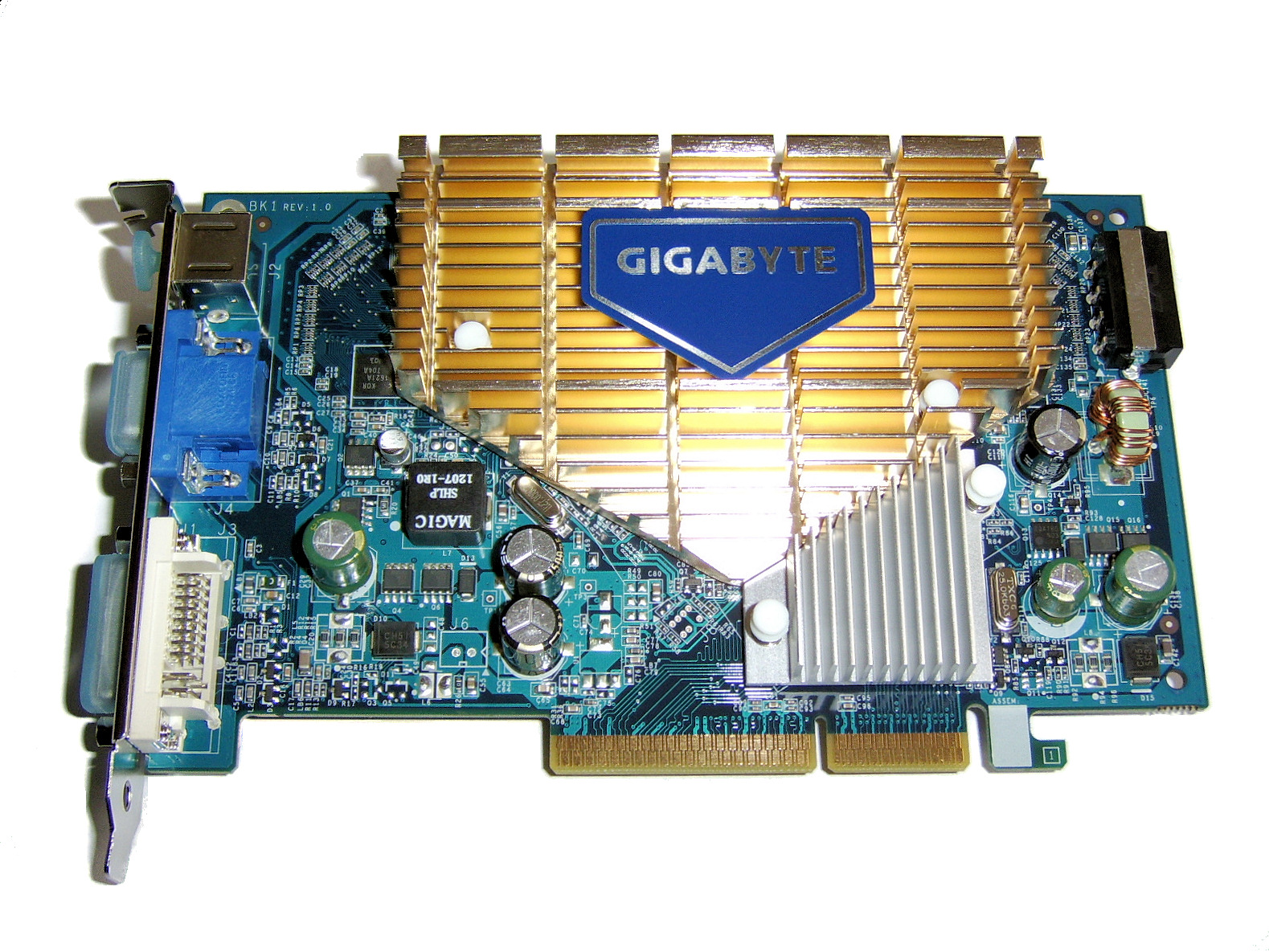
GeForce 7600 GS

On March 22, 2006, Nvidia announced the immediate availability of the GeForce 7600 GS GPU targeted at the low-mid end. This new GPU assumed the place of the GeForce 6600 GT, which had been around for some time.

The AGP version was introduced on July 21, 2006. According to Nvidia, this card is identical to the PCI-e version other than the interface. In addition, the AGP version uses Nvidia's AGP-PCIe bridge chip.

Preliminary testing showed that the GeForce 7600 GS outperforms a GeForce 6600 GT and ATI's counterpart, the ATI Radeon X1600 Pro.

=== GeForce 7600 GT ===
The 7600 GT is the high-mid range product in the 7 Series family.

The 7600 GT contains all the features of the GeForce 7 family. It was made to provide a GeForce 7 series card to the mass market; some companies released AGP versions. It incorporates DDR3 memory.

== GeForce 7650 series ==
Much like the 7500 series, the 7650 GS was only available to OEMs.

=== GeForce 7650 GS (OEM) ===
The GeForce 7650GS was limited to a few OEM cards only. Not much is known about this card, other than that it uses the 80 nm process and uses DDR2 memory, with examples having 256MB of DDR2 ram.

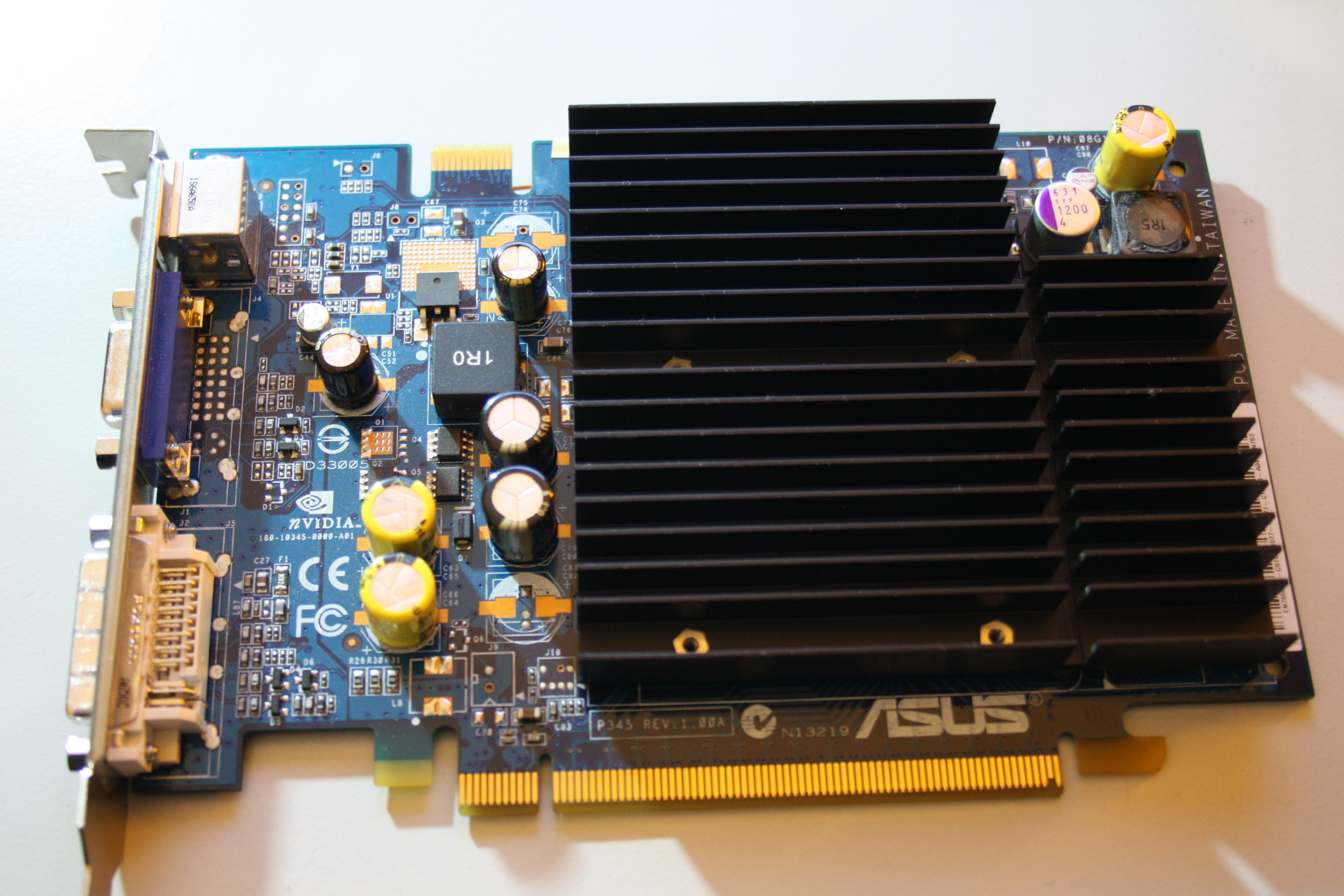
ASUS Geforce 7650GS

== GeForce 7800 series ==
The 7800 series was designed to deliver exceptional performance and was targeted towards the high-end market segment. This series was discontinued and replaced with the 7900 series in early 2006.

A total of 4 models were available: GeForce 7800 GTX 512, GeForce 7800 GTX, GeForce 7800 GT, and GeForce 7800 GS.

Features

In addition to the standard GeForce 7 series features, the 7800 series supports following advanced features:

- High dynamic range rendering
- UltraShadow II
- CineFX 4.0 Engine

=== GeForce 7800 GT ===
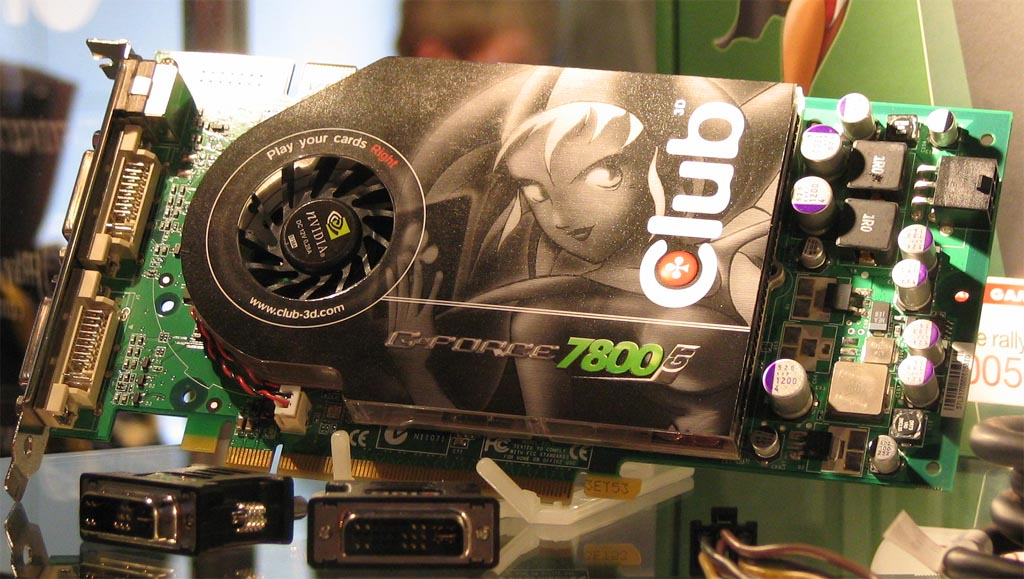
Geforce 7800 GT

The GeForce 7800 GT is the second GPU in the series, launched on August 11, 2005 with immediate retail availability. It has 20 pixel pipelines, 7 vertex shaders, 16 ROPs and a 400 MHz core clock, 500 MHz memory clock (1 GHz effective) using GDDR3 memory.

The GeForce 7800 GT had been introduced as a more affordable alternative to the 7800 GTX. At the time it was considered the performance/cost champion of video cards.

=== GeForce 7800 GS AGP ===
On February 2, 2006, Nvidia announced the 7800 GS as the first AGP video card in the GeForce 7 series lineup, an AGP version of the high-end GeForce 7 series.

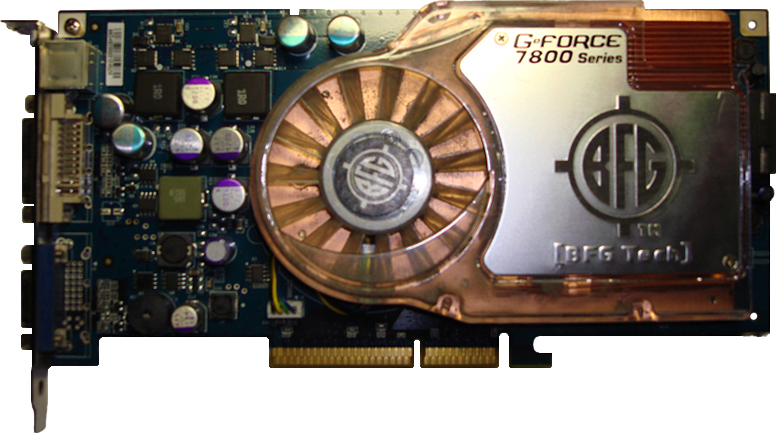
A BFG TECH 7800 GS AGP

This card was promoted by several hardware enthusiasts as "the last high-ended AGP card in existence". It has 16 pixel shader units instead of the 20 that the 7800 GT has, but still benefits from the optimizations of the other 7-series GPUs enjoy. Clock speeds are 375 MHz for the GPU and 1200 MHz for the (GDDR3) memory. According to all benchmark tests, the performance of this card is faster than the GeForce 6800 GT and GeForce 6800 Ultra. Different vendors may deviate from the stated specification. It serves to provide a great upgrade path for those with high-end AGP systems who don't want to switch to a new high-end PCI-Express system. There was a special "Golden Sample" release from Gainward that was called "7800 GS+" or officially "Bliss 7800 GS 512 MB GS+" that had default clock speeds of 450 MHz core and 1250 MHz memory. Unlike a standard 7800 GS, the 7800 GS+ actually used a 7900 GT GPU that had the full 24 pixel shaders instead of the regular 16 pixel shaders that are normally found on a 7800 GS video card.

Gainward had previously released a "Bliss 7800 GS 512MB GS" card that was based on a 7800 GT but utilized the AGP bus. Its external appearance and name make it nearly indistinguishable from the 7900 GT-based Bliss 7800 GS 512MB GS+. Leadtek produced a similar card with 256MB memory.

In late 2006 Gainward released a third '7800 GS' card with 20 pixel shaders running at 500 MHz core and 1400 MHz memory called the "BLISS GS-GLH". This card is also based on the 7900 GS core.

=== GeForce 7800 GTX ===
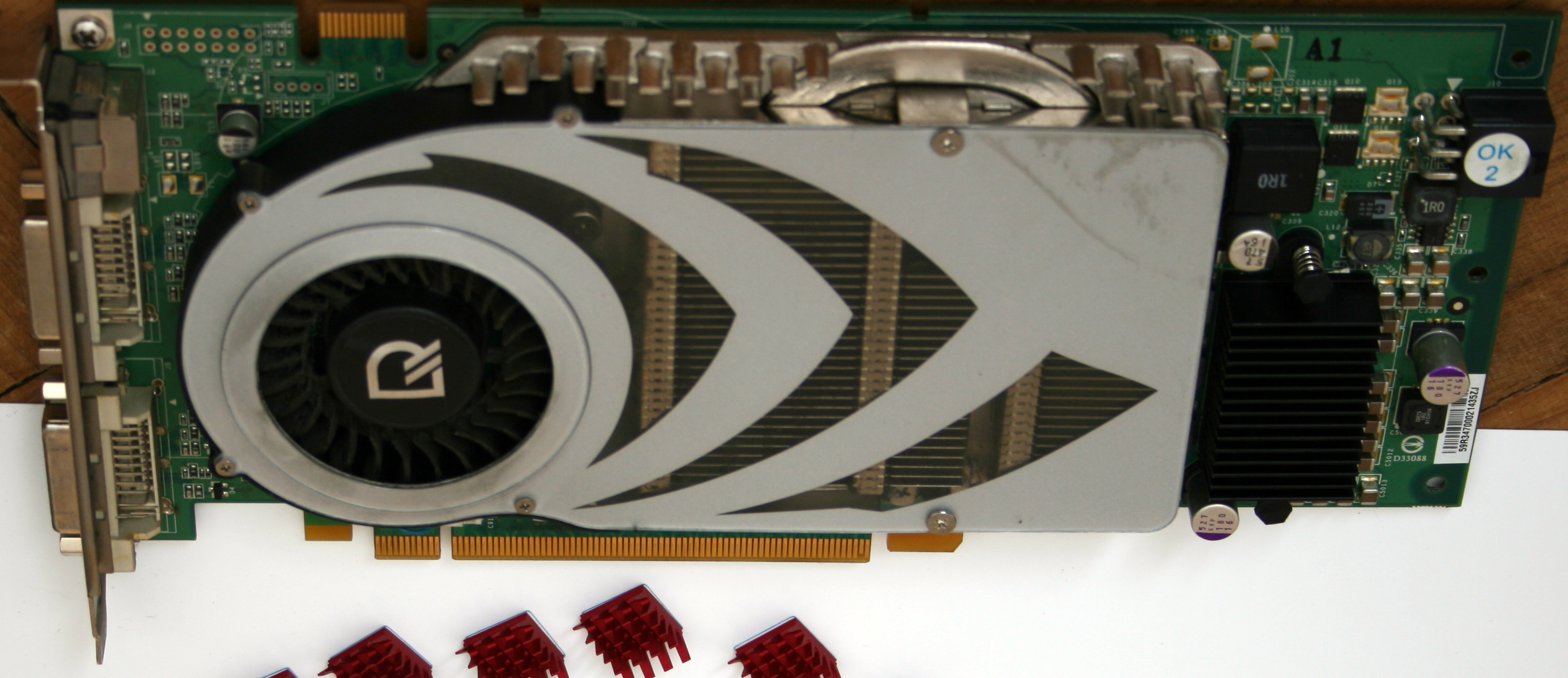
Geforce 7800 GTX

The GeForce 7800 GTX (codenamed G70, and previously NV47) was the first GPU in the series, launched on June 22, 2005 with immediate retail availability. The GeForce 7800 GTX supported the highest specification DirectX 9 vertex and pixel shaders, at the time: Version 3.0. It was natively a PCI Express chip. SLI support had been retained and improved from the previous generation.

According to PC World, the 7800 GTX was "one of the most complex processors ever designed". The GPU had 302 million transistors (the Athlon 64 X2 4800+ CPU has 233.2 million transistors), along with 24 pixel and 8 vertex shaders. It was succeeded by the 7900 GTX on March 9, 2006.

The PlayStation 3's Reality Synthesizer is based on the 256 MB model of the 7800 GTX, but with slight modifications.

=== GeForce 7800 GTX 512 ===
The 512 MB version of the GeForce 7800 GTX was released on November 14, 2005. The card features more than simply an increased frame buffer from 256 MB to 512 MB. The card features a much improved core clock speed of 550 MHz vs. 430 MHz (27.9% increase) and fast 1.1 ns GDDR3 memory clocked at 1.7 GHz vs. 1.2 GHz (41.7% increase), when compared to the original version. Like ATI's X1800 XT, the addition of another 256 MB of memory, and to a lesser extent, the increased clock speeds, have raised the heat and power output significantly. To combat this, the GeForce 7800 GTX 512 sports a much larger yet quieter dual slot cooling solution when compared to the original 256 MB version.

== GeForce 7900 series ==
Nvidia officially announced availability of the GeForce 7900 series on March 9, 2006.

Replacing the 7800 series, Nvidia's 7900 series was a product refresh and not a new generation of Nvidia's GPU, running at 650 MHz. Officially, this series was meant to support mainly PCI Express Interface but some companies released also AGP versions.

A total of 5 models have been developed and are available: 7900 GX2, 7900 GTX, 7900 GT, 7900 GTO and 7900 GS.

Features

In addition to the standard GeForce 7 series features, the 7900 series supports following advanced features:

- High dynamic range rendering
- UltraShadow II
- CineFX 4.0 Engine
- Extreme HD

=== GeForce 7900 GS ===
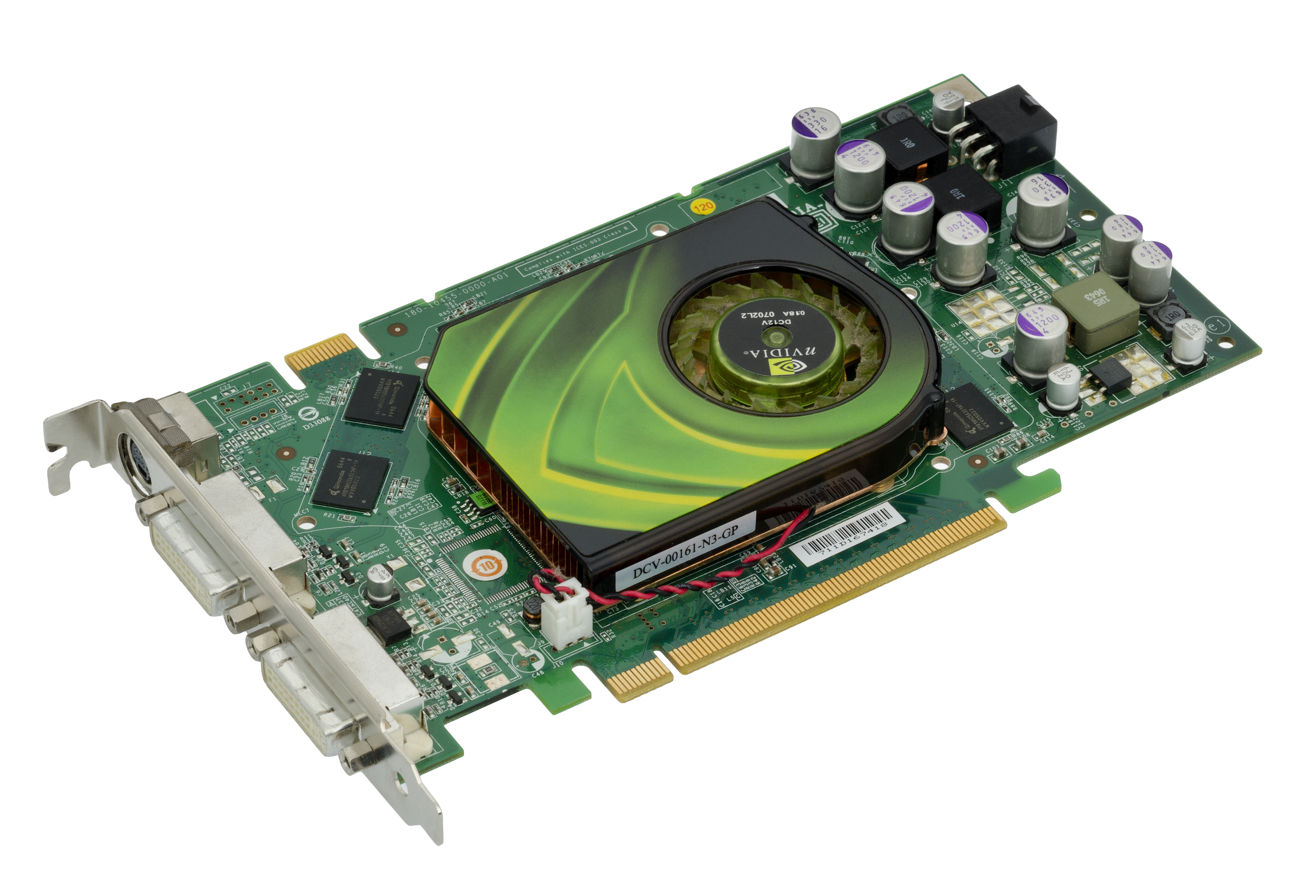
GeForce 7900 GS

Introduced during the fall of 2006, at a MSRP of US$199, the 7900 GS filled the gap between the mid-end GeForce 7600 GT and the high-end GeForce 7900 GT. The card was unofficially launched August 23 by woot! as a white box OEM. However, the product's company, MSI, made claims that these cards were stolen from MSI during transportation and sold to woot!. The referenced MSI customer notice has been changed to remove explicit references to woot!. As of March 2007, Nvidia had discontinued production of a number of GeForce 6 and 7 series products, including the 7900 GS.

The GeForce 7900 GS has 20 pixel processors, 7 vertex processors, 256-bits memory bus, and comes clocked at approximately 450 MHz/1320 MHz for core/memory, which should provide slightly lower performance than the 7900 GT. The GeForce 7900 GS is powered by the graphics chip code-named G71, thus, shares the same advantages as the G71 did over its immediate predecessor G70: dual-link DVI outputs, reduced power consumption, higher performance.

=== GeForce 7900 GT ===
This video card was released on March 9, 2006. Like the 7900 GTX, it uses the G71 GPU that is produced at 90 nm. It too offers all the features of the 7800 series as well as an attractive performance-to-price ratio.

=== GeForce 7900 GTX ===
The GeForce 7900 GTX is a 90 nm produced G70 (named G71) and features all the same features of the 7800 GTX but is built upon the smaller manufacturing process. Due to shortages of memory modules for the 512 MB GTX, more readily available 1600 MHz memory was used.

=== GeForce 7900 GTO ===
The 7900 GTO is a close cousin of the 7900 GTX. The GTO first arrived at a handful of retailers around October 1, 2006. At the time of launch, GTO boards sold for around US$250, compared to the 7900 GTX boards that cost in excess of $400 at the time. The GTO was essentially identical to the GTX, with the exception that it lacked HDCP and VIVO support, had underclocked memory running at 1320 MHz, and used tighter memory timings. Other than that, the two boards were identical: same PCB, same cooler, same GPU. The GTO used extremely fast 1.1ns Samsung BJ11 GDDR3 memory running at 1.8V, as opposed to the 2.1V it is rated at. Clock speeds on the two cards are identical, at 650 MHz. At stock memory speeds, most comparisons found the GTO to lag behind the GTX by roughly a 5-10% margin.

The majority of owners find that their GTO will overclock to 1600 MHz memory speeds, despite the under-volted RAM. Many flash their GTO to a GTX BIOS to officially make it a GTX. GTO owners having trouble reaching GTX speeds with BIOS version 5.71.22.39.13 or newer are advised to simply flash to an older BIOS version such as 5.71.22.39.08, this seems to solve overclocking problems for most users.

The GTO was an extremely popular card among enthusiasts as it offered near GTX performance at a considerably lower price. It was a limited production card aimed at cleaning out G70 inventories before the release of the G80, and only spent about a month in retail channels before selling out.

=== GeForce 7900 GX2 ===
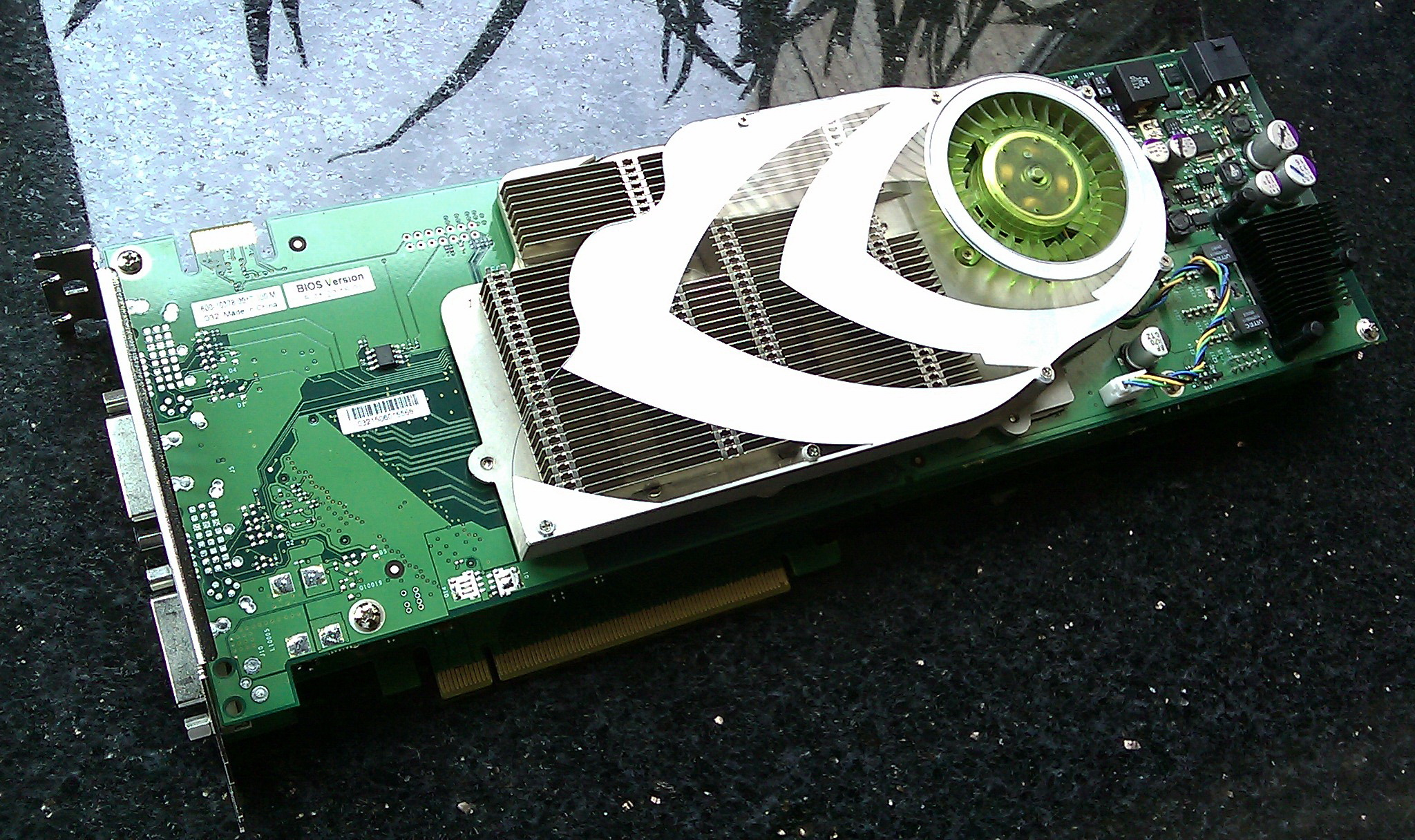
GeForce 7900 GX2, also known as GeForce 7900 GTX Duo

The GeForce 7900 GX2 is two videocards stacked to fit as a dual slot solution. This is not like products such as the ASUS Dual GeForce 7800 GT or nVidia's own 7950 GX2, where two GPUs are on the same card. This enables quad-SLI on two PCI Express x16 slots. Other OEM companies have access to the GX2 and it is available from numerous vendors.

The card features a 500 MHz GPU and 1200 MHz effective RAM speed. Although the power of the GX2 is less than the 7900 GTX, each card is more powerful than the 7900 GT.

Many issues in this implementation of a dual-GPU unit convinced Nvidia to restrict its sale to OEM companies. The card is extremely long, with only the largest e-ATX cases being able to hold it. Two of the cards operating in quad-SLI also required extremely well designed airflow to function, and demanded a 1000 watt power supply unit.

== GeForce 7950 series ==
GeForce 7950 Series is the last addition in the GeForce 7 series. Officially, this series was meant to support only PCI Express Interface but some companies released AGP versions.

Two models are available: 7950 GT and 7950 GX2.

Features

In addition to the standard GeForce 7 series features, the 7950 series supports following advanced features:

- High dynamic range rendering
- UltraShadow II
- CineFX 4.0 Engine
- Extreme HD

=== GeForce 7950 GT ===
On September 14, 2006 Nvidia released the 7950GT. Announced with a 550 MHz core clock, 700 MHz (1400 MHz effective) memory clock, 24 pixel shader units, standard configurations come equipped with both 512 MB GDDR3 memory and HDCP support. At an introductory price of US$300, the GeForce 7950 GT replaces the older GeForce 7900 GT and improves performance: the GeForce 7950 GT has a fillrate of 13,200 Megatexels/s and a memory bandwidth of 44.8 GB/s (versus 10800 Megatexels/s and 940 Megavertices/s for the 7900 GT).

=== GeForce 7950 GX2 ===
This is essentially a dual-GPU video card that takes up only a single PCIe x16 slot, allowing for 4 GPUs to run with only two PCIe x16 slots, in standard SLI motherboards. Unlike the 7900 GX2 before it, this version is available to consumers directly.

The 7950 GX2 was released to retail on June 5, 2006, and shares similar specs to the GeForce 7900 GX2, with 500 MHz GPU clock, and 1200 MHz effective RAM speed. 512 MB of memory per GPU, for a total of 1 GB, however total performance is more in line with 512 MB since each GPU can only access its own memory and not the memory of the other one. It does not offer any advantages over single-GPU cards with 512 MB, memory wise.

This card is designed for the DIY market; it addresses many problems which the previous 7900 GX2 had suffered from, such as noise, size, power consumption, and price. The 7950 GX2 requires only a single PCIe power connector, in contrast to the twin-connectors of its predecessor; technically, this is understandable, as there is no need for a ring bus configuration – frames need only be passed on to the primary GPU. It is much shorter, fitting easily in the same space as a 7900 GTX. Lesser board layout and the removal of cooling vents on the bracket have greatly reduced temperatures, allowing the fans to run at a lower speed, thereby lowering noise. As of September 2006, the board can be found for $299, half the cost of a 7900 GX2.

According to some review sites (such as Tom's Hardware - see above), a single 7950GX2 draws less power than a single ATI Radeon X1900 XT – some consider this an amazing feat considering the GX2 employs a pair of GPUs, when the Radeon uses only one. Other review sites say that a GX2 is quieter than the aforementioned Radeon, despite the GX2 boasting a pair of identical GPU coolers – however 'loudness' is highly subjective without the proper tools and testing conditions. If true, this would make a pair of GX2 cards cooler, quieter, and less power hungry than a pair of X1900 XT cards in CrossFire. However, there is no appreciable performance gain from pairing two 7950 GX2 cards in most applications, while dual X1900 XT configurations see large performance boosts in CrossFire mode.

On August 9, 2006, Nvidia released initial ForceWare 91.45 drivers for Windows 2000 and XP that support Quad SLI. The Quad SLI support was soon merged in with the normal WHQL driver package, when ForceWare 91.47 drivers was released on October 16, 2006.

== Technical summary ==
- All models support Transparency AA (starting with version 91.47 of the ForceWare drivers)

Model	Launch	Code name	Fab (nm)	Transistors (million)	Die size (mm^{2})	Bus interface	Core clock (MHz)	Memory clock (MHz)	Core config (Note: Pixel shaders: vertex shaders: texture mapping units: render output units)	Fillrate				Memory				Performance (GFLOPS)	TDP (Watts)
Model	Launch	Code name	Fab (nm)	Transistors (million)	Die size (mm^{2})	Bus interface	Core clock (MHz)	Memory clock (MHz)	Core config	MOperations/s	MPixels/s	MTexels/s	MVertices/s	Size (MB)	Bandwidth (GB/s)	Bus type	Bus width (bit)	Performance (GFLOPS)	TDP (Watts)
GeForce 7025 + nForce 630a	July 2007	MCP68S	TSMC 110 nm			HyperTransport	425	200 (DDR); 400 (DDR2); 933 (DDR3)	2:1:2:2	850	850	850	106.25	Up to 256 system RAM	6.4; 12.8; 34	DDR; DDR2; DDR3	64; 128	?	?
GeForce 7050PV + nForce 630a	July 2007	MCP67QV	TSMC 110 nm			HyperTransport	425	200 (DDR); 400 (DDR2); 933 (DDR3)	2:1:2:2	850	850	850	106.25	Up to 256 system RAM	6.4; 12.8; 34	DDR; DDR2; DDR3	64; 128	?	?
GeForce 7050 + nForce 610i/630i	July 2007	MCP73	TSMC 90 nm			HyperTransport/FSB	500	333	2:1:2:2	1,000	1,000	1,000	125	Up to 256 system RAM	5.336	DDR2	64	?	?
GeForce 7100 + nForce 630i	July 2007	MCP76	TSMC 90 nm			FSB	600	400	2:1:2:2	1,200	1,200	1,200	150	Up to 256 system RAM	6.4	DDR2	64	?	?
GeForce 7150 + nForce 630i	July 2007	MCP76	TSMC 90 nm			FSB	630	400	2:1:2:2	1,260	1,260	1,260	157.5	Up to 256 system RAM	6.4	DDR2	64	?	?
GeForce 7100 GS	August 8, 2006	NV44	TSMC 110 nm	75	110	PCIe x16	350	266; 333	4:3:4:2	1,400	700	1,400	262.5	128; 256	2.4; 4.8	DDR2	32; 64	?	?
GeForce 7200 GS	January 18, 2006	G72	TSMC 90 nm	112	81	PCIe x16	450	400	2:2:4:2	1,800	900	1,800	337.5	128; 256	3.2; 6.4	DDR2	32; 64	0.9	11
GeForce 7300 SE	March 22, 2006	G72	TSMC 90 nm	112	81	PCIe x16	350	333	4:3:4:2	1,800	900	1,800	337.5	128	2.656; 5.328	DDR2	32; 64	?	?
GeForce 7300 LE	March 22, 2006	G72	TSMC 90 nm	112	81	PCIe x16	350	333	4:3:4:2	1,800	900	1,800	337.5	128	2.656; 5.328	DDR2	32; 64	1.4	13
GeForce 7300 GS	January 18, 2006	G72	TSMC 90 nm	112	81	PCIe x16	550	400	4:3:4:2	2,200	1,100	2,200	412.5	128; 256	6.4	DDR2	64	2.2	10
GeForce 7300 GT	May 15, 2006	G73	TSMC 90 nm	177	125	AGP 8x PCIe x16	350	325 (DDR2); 700 (GDDR3)	8:5:8:4	2,800	1,400	2,800	437.5	128; 256	10.4; 22.4	DDR2; GDDR3	128	2.8	24
GeForce 7500 LE	2006	G72	TSMC 90 nm	112	81	PCIe x16	475; 550	405; 324	4:3:4:2	2,200	1,100	2,200	593.8	64; 128; 256	6.480; 5.2	DDR2	64	?	10
GeForce 7600 GS	March 22, 2006 (PCIe); July 1, 2006 (AGP)	G73	TSMC 90 nm	177	125	AGP 8x PCIe x16	400	400 (DDR2); 700 (GDDR3)	12:5:12:8	4,800	3,200	4,800	500	256	12.8; 22.4	DDR2; GDDR3	128	4.8	30
GeForce 7600 GT	March 9, 2006 (PCIe); July 15, 2006 (AGP)	G73	TSMC 90 nm	177	125	AGP 8x PCIe x16	560	400 (DDR2); 700 (GDDR3)	12:5:12:8	6,720	4,480	6,720	700	256	12.8; 22.4	DDR2; GDDR3	128	6.7	?
GeForce 7600 GT 80 nm	January 8, 2007	G73-B1	TSMC 80 nm	177	125	AGP 8x PCIe x16	560	400 (DDR2); 700 (GDDR3)	12:5:12:8	6,720	4,480	6,720	700	256	12.8; 22.4	DDR2; GDDR3	128	?	48
GeForce 7650 GS	March 22, 2006	G73	TSMC 80 nm	177	125	PCIe x16	450	400	12:5:12:8	5,400	3,600	5,400	562.5	256	12.7	DDR2	128	?	?
GeForce 7800 GS	February 2, 2006	G70	TSMC 110 nm	302	333	AGP 8x	375	600	16:8:16:8	6,000	3,000	6,000	750	256	38.4	GDDR3	256	6	70
GeForce 7800 GT	August 11, 2005	G70	TSMC 110 nm	302	333	PCIe x16	400	500	20:7:20:16	8,000	6,400	8,000	700	256	32	GDDR3	256	8	59
GeForce 7800 GTX	June 22, 2005 (256 MB); November 14, 2005 (512 MB)	G70	TSMC 110 nm	302	333	PCIe x16	430 (256 MB); 550 (512 MB)	600 (256 MB); 850 (512 MB)	24:8:24:16	10,320 (256 MB); 13,200 (512 MB)	6,880 (256 MB); 8800 (512 MB)	10,320 (256 MB); 13,200 (512 MB)	860 (256 MB); 1,100 (512 MB)	256; 512	38.4 (256 MB); 54.4 (512 MB)	GDDR3	256	10.3; 13.2	100 (256 MB); 116 (512 MB)
GeForce 7900 GS	May 2006 (PCIe); April 2, 2007 (AGP)	G71	TSMC 90 nm	278	196	AGP 8x PCIe x16	450	660	20:7:20:16	9,000	7,200	9,000	787.5	256	42.24	GDDR3	256	9	50
GeForce 7900 GT	March 9, 2006	G71	TSMC 90 nm	278	196	PCIe x16	450	660	24:8:24:16	10,800	7,200	10,800	900	256	42.24	GDDR3	256	10.8	65
GeForce 7900 GTO	October 1, 2006	G71	TSMC 90 nm	278	196	PCIe x16	650	660	24:8:24:16	15,600	10,400	15,600	1,300	512	42.24	GDDR3	256	15.6	?
GeForce 7900 GTX	March 9, 2006	G71	TSMC 90 nm	278	196	PCIe x16	650	800	24:8:24:16	15,600	10,400	15,600	1,300	512	51.2	GDDR3	256	15.6	105
GeForce 7900 GX2	March 9, 2006	2x G71	TSMC 90 nm	278	196	PCIe x16	500	600	2x 24:8:24:16	24,000	16,000	24,000	2,000	2x 512	2x 38.4	GDDR3	256	?	?
GeForce 7950 GT	September 6, 2006 (PCIe); April 2, 2007 (AGP)	G71	TSMC 90 nm	278	196	AGP 8x PCIe x16	550	700	24:8:24:16	13,200	8,800	13,200	1,100	512	44.8	GDDR3	256	13.2	90
GeForce 7950 GX2	June 5, 2006	2x G71	TSMC 90 nm	278	196	PCIe x16	500	600	2x 24:8:24:16	24,000	16,000	24,000	2000	2x 512	2x 38.4	GDDR3	256	24	136
Model	Launch	Code name	Fab (nm)	Transistors (million)	Die size (mm^{2})	Bus interface	Core clock (MHz)	Memory clock (MHz)	Core config	MOperations/s	MPixels/s	MTexels/s	MVertices/s	Size (MB)	Bandwidth (GB/s)	Bus type	Bus width (bit)	Performance (GFLOPS)	TDP (Watts)
Model	Launch	Code name	Fab (nm)	Transistors (million)	Die size (mm^{2})	Bus interface	Core clock (MHz)	Memory clock (MHz)	Core config	Fillrate				Memory				Performance (GFLOPS)	TDP (Watts)

=== Feature list ===
Model	Features				
Model	Gamma-correct antialiasing	64-bit OpenEXR HDR	Scalable Link Interface (SLI)	TurboCache	Dual Link DVI
GeForce 7100 GS	No	No	Yes (PCIe only, No SLI bridge)	Yes	No
GeForce 7200 GS	Yes	Yes	No	Yes	No
GeForce 7300 SE	Yes	Yes	No	Yes	No
GeForce 7300 LE	Yes	Yes	No	Yes	No
GeForce 7300 GS	Yes	Yes	Yes (PCIe only)	Yes	No
GeForce 7300 GT	Yes	Yes	Yes (PCIe only, No SLI bridge)	No	One port
GeForce 7600 GS	Yes	Yes	Yes (PCIe only)	No	One port
GeForce 7600 GT	Yes	Yes	Yes (PCIe only)	No	One port
GeForce 7600 GT (80 nm)	Yes	Yes	Yes	No	One port
GeForce 7650 GS (80 nm)	Yes	Yes	Yes (Depending on OEM Design)	No	One port
GeForce 7800 GS	Yes	Yes	No	No	One port
GeForce 7800 GT	Yes	Yes	Yes	No	One port
GeForce 7800 GTX	Yes	Yes	Yes	No	One port
GeForce 7800 GTX 512	Yes	Yes	Yes	No	One port
GeForce 7900 GS	Yes	Yes	Yes (PCIe only)	No	Two ports
GeForce 7900 GT	Yes	Yes	Yes	No	Two ports
GeForce 7900 GTO	Yes	Yes	Yes	No	Two ports
GeForce 7900 GTX	Yes	Yes	Yes	No	Two ports
GeForce 7900 GX2 (GTX Duo)	Yes	Yes	Yes	No	Two ports
GeForce 7950 GT	Yes	Yes	Yes (PCIe only)	No	Two ports
GeForce 7950 GX2	Yes	Yes	Yes	No	Two ports

== GeForce Go 7 series ==
Nvidia has not only targeted the desktop market but also the notebook market with the GeForce 7 series.

Features

In addition to the standard GeForce 7 series features, the GeForce Go 7 series supports following advanced features:

- Extreme HD
- PowerMizer Mobile
- MXM Graphics Module
- High dynamic range rendering
- UltraShadow II
- CineFX 4.0 Engine
- Nvidia PureVideo HD

The GeForce Go 7 GPU series line-up

The GeForce Go 7 GPU series line-up consists of following models:

- GeForce Go 7950
- GeForce Go 7900
- GeForce Go 7800
- GeForce Go 7700
- GeForce Go 7600
- GeForce Go 7400
- GeForce Go 7300
- GeForce Go 7200
- GeForce 7150M / nForce 630M
- GeForce 7000M / nForce 610M

=== GeForce Go 7 (Go 7xxx) series ===
The GeForce Go 7 series for notebooks architecture.

- ^{1} Vertex shaders: pixel shaders: texture mapping units: render output units
- ^{2} Graphics card supports TurboCache, memory size entries in bold indicate total memory (graphics + system RAM), otherwise entries are graphics RAM only

Model	Launch	Code name	Fab (nm)	Bus interface	Core clock (MHz)	Memory clock (MHz)	Core config^{1}	Fillrate		Memory				Supported API version		TDP (Watts)	Features
Model	Launch	Code name	Fab (nm)	Bus interface	Core clock (MHz)	Memory clock (MHz)	Core config^{1}	Pixel (GP/s)	Texture (GT/s)	Size (MB)	Bandwidth (GB/s)	Bus type	Bus width (bit)	Direct3D	OpenGL	TDP (Watts)	Features
GeForce 7000M	February 1, 2006	MCP67MV	90	Hyper Transport	350	System memory	1:2:2:2	0.7	0.7	Up to 256 from system memory	System memory	DDR2	64/128	9.0c	2.1	Unknown	
GeForce 7150M	February 1, 2006	MCP67M	90	Hyper Transport	425	System memory	1:2:2:2	0.85	0.85	Up to 256 from system memory	System memory	DDR2	64/128	9.0c	2.1	Unknown	
GeForce Go 7200^{2}	January 2006	G72M	90	PCIe x16	450	700	3:4:4:1	0.45	1.8	64	2.8	GDDR3	32	9.0c	2.1	Unknown	Transparency Anti-Aliasing
GeForce Go 7300^{2}	January 2006	G72M	90	PCIe x16	350	700	3:4:4:2	0.7	1.4	128, 256, **512**	5.60	GDDR3	64	9.0c	2.1	Unknown	Transparency Anti-Aliasing
GeForce Go 7400^{2}	January 2006	G72M	90	PCIe x16	450	900	3:4:4:2	0.9	1.8	64, **256**	7.20	GDDR3	64	9.0c	2.1	Unknown	Transparency Anti-Aliasing
GeForce Go 7600	March 2006	G73M	90	PCIe x16	450	1000	5:8:8:8	3.6	3.6	256, 512	16	GDDR3	128	9.0c	2.1	Unknown	Scalable Link Interface (SLI), Transparency Anti-Aliasing
GeForce Go 7600 GT	2006	G73M	90	PCIe x16	500	1200	5:12:12:8	4	6	256	19.2	GDDR3	128	9.0c	2.1	Unknown	Scalable Link Interface (SLI), Transparency Anti-Aliasing
GeForce Go 7700	2006	G73-N-B1	80	PCIe x16	450	1000	5:12:12:8	3.6	5.4	512	16	GDDR3	128	9.0c	2.1	Unknown	Scalable Link Interface (SLI), Transparency Anti-Aliasing
GeForce Go 7800	March 3, 2006	G70M	110	PCIe x16	400	1100	6:16:16:8	3.2	6.4	256	35.2	GDDR3	256	9.0c	2.1	35	Scalable Link Interface (SLI), Transparency Anti-Aliasing
GeForce Go 7800 GTX	October 2005	G70M	110	PCIe x16	400	1100	8:24:24:16	6.4	9.6	256	35.2	GDDR3	256	9.0c	2.1	65	Scalable Link Interface (SLI), Transparency Anti-Aliasing
GeForce Go 7900 GS	April 2006	G71M	90	PCIe x16	375	1000	7:20:20:16	6	7.5	256	32.0	GDDR3	256	9.0c	2.1	20	Scalable Link Interface (SLI), Transparency Anti-Aliasing
GeForce Go 7900 GTX	April 2006	G71M	90	PCIe x16	500	1200	8:24:24:16	8	12	256 512	38.4	GDDR3	256	9.0c	2.1	45	Scalable Link Interface (SLI), Transparency Anti-Aliasing
GeForce Go 7950 GTX	October 2006	G71M	90	PCIe x16	575	1400	8:24:24:16	9.2	13.8	512	44.8	GDDR3	256	9.0c	2.1	45	Scalable Link Interface (SLI), Transparency Anti-Aliasing

== Support ==
Nvidia has ceased driver support for GeForce 7 series.

=== Final drivers ===
The GeForce 7 series is the last to support Windows 2000. The successor GeForce 8 series only supports Windows XP and later (the Windows 8 drivers also support Windows 10).

- Windows 2000: 94.24 released on May 17, 2006; Download
- Windows XP 32-bit & Media Center Edition: 307.83 released on February 25, 2013; Download
- Windows XP 64-bit: 307.83 released on February 25, 2013; Download
- Windows Vista, 7 & 8 32-bit: 309.08 released on February 24, 2015; Download
- Windows Vista, 7 & 8 64-bit: 309.08 released on February 24, 2015; Download

The drivers for Windows 2000/XP can also be installed on later versions of Windows such as Windows Vista and 7; however, they do not support desktop compositing or the Aero effects of these operating systems.

(Products supported list also on this page)

Windows XP/2000 Driver Archive

== See also ==
- Comparison of Nvidia graphics processing units (GPUs only shown by general category, i.e. NV40, NV30, etc.)
- Curie (microarchitecture)
- GeForce 6 series
- GeForce 8 series
- PCI Express
- PlayStation 3
