= Intellisample =

Anti-aliasing method used in Nvidia graphics cards

Intellisample is Nvidia's method for anti-aliasing in GeForce-branded graphics cards.

== Intellisample 4.0 ==
Version 4.0 is used in the GeForce 6 and GeForce 7 series, and includes two new methods, transparency supersampling (TSAA) and the faster but lower-quality transparency multisampling (TMAA). These methods are designed to improve anti-aliasing quality of scenes with partially transparent textures (such as chain link fences) and textures at oblique angles to the viewing screen.

Intellisample 4.0 support was enabled, unannounced, for GeForce 6 series cards in Nvidia's display driver (Forceware), version 91.45. This is not mentioned in the driver Release Notes or on Nvidia's website.
