= Sparkle Computer =

Taiwanese electronics firm

Sparkle Computer Co., Ltd.
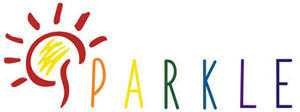
- Company type: Private
- Industry: Computer hardware
- Founded: 1982; 44 years ago
- Headquarters: Taipei, Taiwan
- Area served: Worldwide
- Products: Graphics cards, consumer electronics
- Website: www.sparkle.com.tw

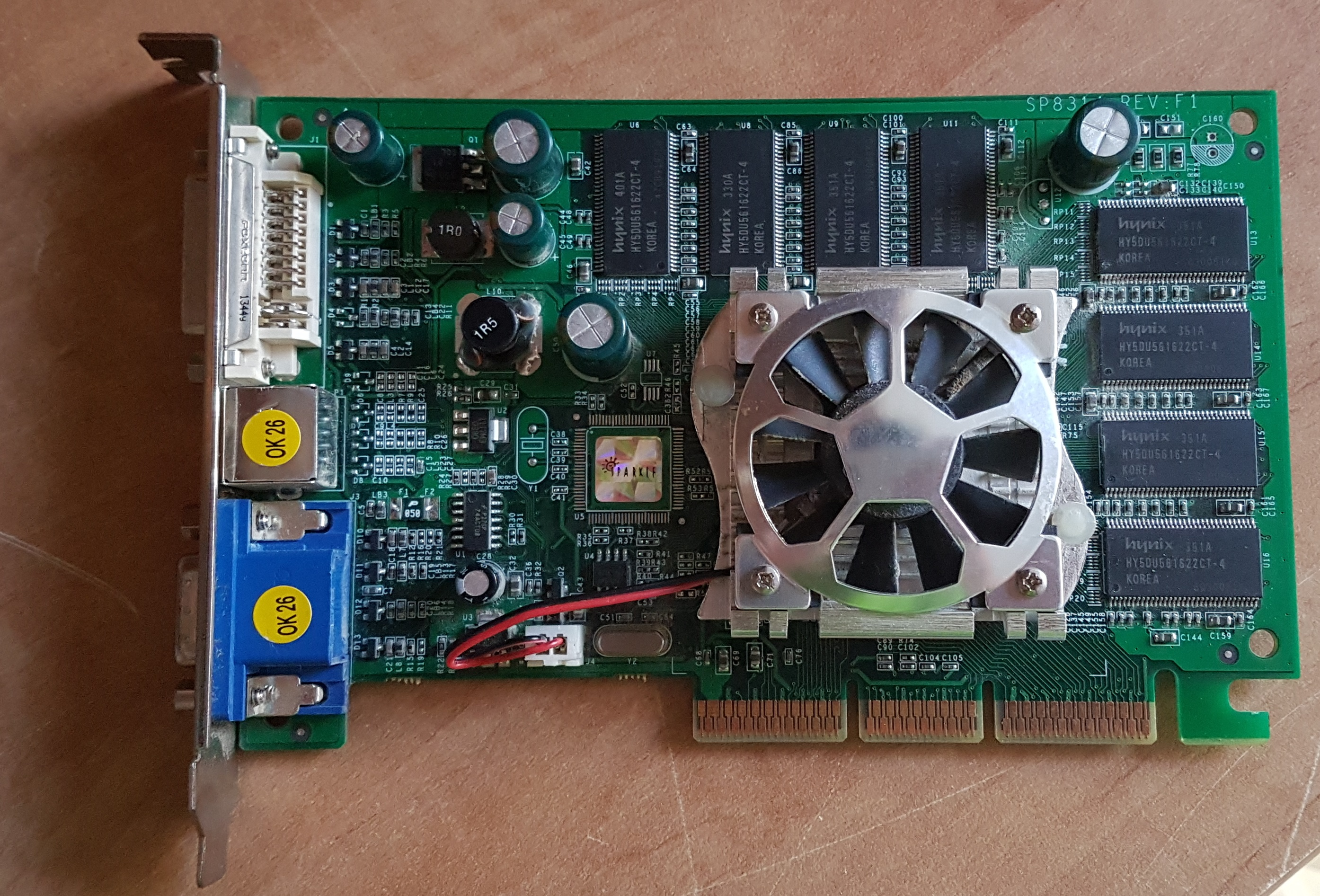
Sparkle GeForce FX 5600XT 256MB AGP

Sparkle Computer Co., Ltd. (stylised as SPARKLE) is a Taiwanese electronics firm established in 1982, based in Taipei. The company specialized in manufacturing video cards using Nvidia graphics processing units, and peripherals (fans and heatsinks) for graphics controllers.

Sparkle was one of the few manufacturers of modern discrete video cards that used the PCI bus, producing PCI versions of GeForce 8 series and GeForce 9 series based discrete graphics controllers, and, more recently, GeForce 200 series and GeForce 600 series-based GPUs using the aforementioned interface.

In April 2023, Sparkle re-entered the graphics card market, this time producing a set of Intel Arc series graphics cards.

== Products ==
=== PCI series ===
==== GeForce 7900 PCI ====
SP-PX79GDH (GeForce 7900 GT series with active cooling - 256MB RAM)

==== GeForce 8400 PCI ====
SPARKLE introduced a unique PCI version of the GeForce 8400 series cards in PCI versions.

- SF-PC84GS512U2LP (GeForce 8400 GS Series with active cooling - 512MB RAM)
- SF-PC84GS512U2LP (GeForce 8400 GS Series with passive cooling - 512MB RAM)
- SF-PC84GS256U2LP (GeForce 8400 GS Series with active cooling - 256MB RAM)
- SF-PC84GS256U2LP (GeForce 8400 GS Series with passive cooling - 256MB RAM)

==== GeForce 8500 PCI ====
SPARKLE introduced a unique PCI version of the GeForce 8500 series card in a PCI version.

- SF-PC85GT256U2 (GeForce 8500 GT Series with passive cooling - 256MB RAM)

==== GeForce 9400 PCI ====
SPARKLE introduced a unique PCI version of the GeForce 9400 series card in a PCI version.

- SP94GT512D2L-HPP (GeForce 9400 GT Series with passive cooling - 512MB RAM)
- SP94GT512D2L-HP (GeForce 9400 GT Series with active cooling - 512MB RAM)
- SP94GT1024D2L-HPP (GeForce 9400 GT Series with passive cooling - 1024MB RAM)
- SP94GT1024D2L-HP (GeForce 9400 GT Series with active cooling - 1024MB RAM)

==== GeForce 9500 PCI ====
SPARKLE introduced a unique PCI version of the GeForce 9500 series card in a PCI version.

- SP95GT512D2L-HP (GeForce 9500 GT Series with active cooling - 512MB RAM)
- SP95GT1024D2L-HP (GeForce 9500 GT Series with active cooling - 1024MB RAM)

=== Low Profile PCIe ===
SPARKLE has also introduced 3 low profile PCI Express cards from the GeForce 9 series:

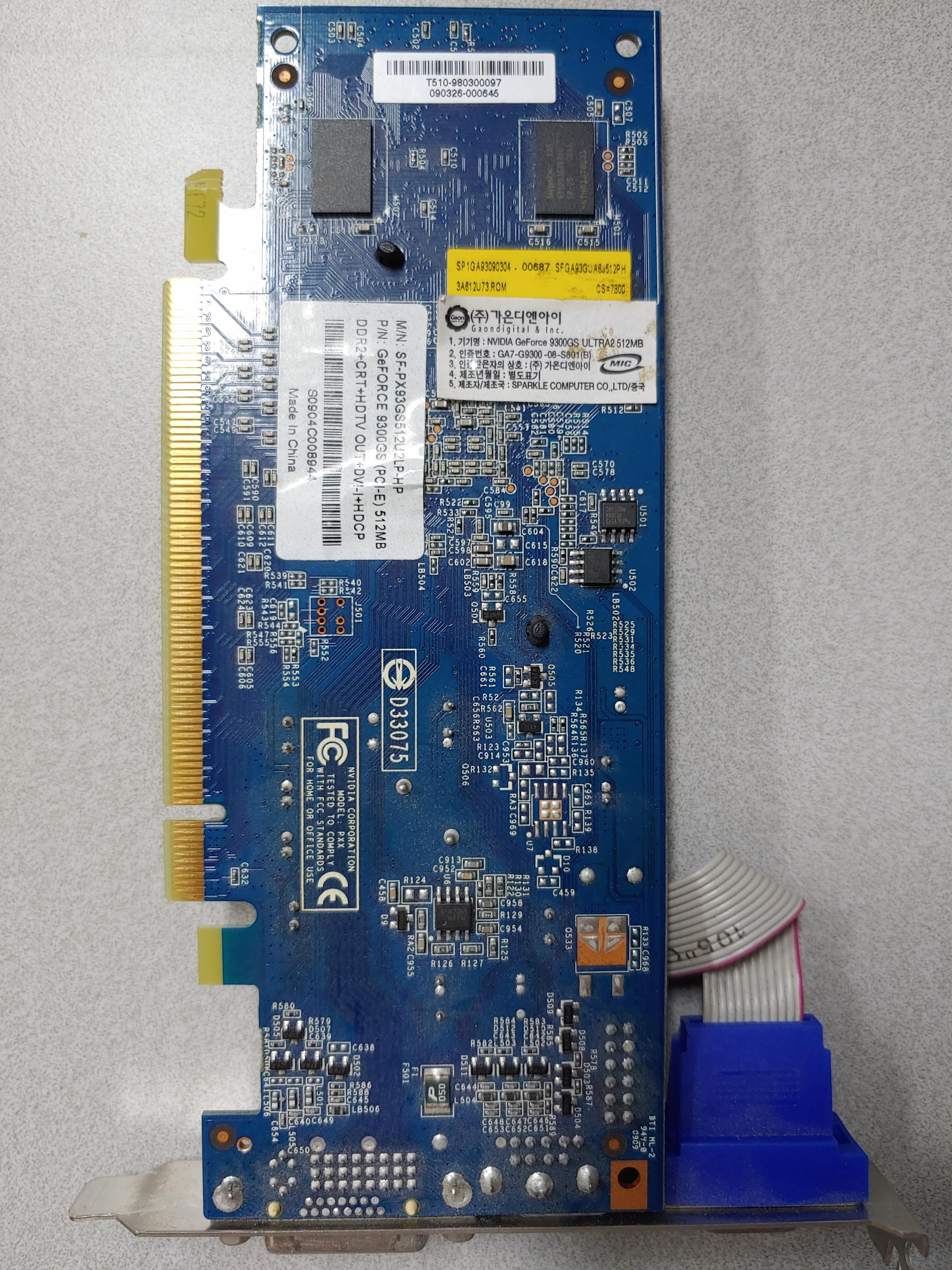
9300GS LP Korean Ver, rev.A6

- SF-PX93GS512U2LP-HP (Low profile GeForce 9300GS with 512MB DDR2 RAM)
- Low profile GeForce 9600 with stock settings
- Low profile GeForce 9800 GT with stock settings and 512MB of GDDR3 RAM on a 256bit bus.

=== Intel Arc Alchemist PCIe ===
In April 2023, SPARKLE listed a set of Intel Arc series graphics cards on their website:

- Sparkle Intel Arc A750 Titan OC Edition (2300 MHz Intel Arc A750)
- Sparkle Intel Arc A750 Orc OC Edition (2200 MHz Intel Arc A750)
- Sparkle Intel Arc A380 ELF (2000 MHz Intel Arc A380)

=== Intel Arc Battlemage PCIe ===
Sparkle continues to sell Intel Arc cards, and has listed on 13 December 2024 a set of Battlemage B580 cards:

- Sparkle Intel Arc B580 Titan OC Edition (2760 MHz Intel Arc B580)
- Sparkle Intel Arc B570 Guardian OC Edition (2660MHz Intel Arc B570)

== See also ==
- List of companies of Taiwan
