= 9700 =

9700 may refer to:

- The year 9700, in the 10th millennium.
- ATI Radeon 9700, a computer graphics card series
- NVIDIA GeForce 9700, a computer graphics card series
