= GeForce 300 series =

Series of GPUs by Nvidia

- Release date: November 27, 2009; 16 years ago
- Codename: GT21x
- Architecture: Tesla
- Models: GeForce series: GeForce GT series
- Transistors: 260M 40 nm (GT218): 486M 40 nm (GT216); 727M 40 nm (GT215); 754M 40 nm (GT215-301)

Cards
- Entry-level: 310; 315; GT 320; GT 330
- Mid-range: GT 340

API support
- Direct3D: Direct3D 10.1; Shader Model 4.1
- OpenCL: OpenCL 1.1
- OpenGL: OpenGL 3.3

History
- Predecessor: GeForce 9 series
- Variant: GeForce 200 series
- Successor: GeForce 400 series

Support status
- Unsupported

The GeForce 300 series is a series of Tesla-based graphics processing units developed by Nvidia, first released in November 2009. Its cards are rebrands of the GeForce 200 series cards, available only for OEMs. All GPUs of the series support Direct3D 10.1, except the GT 330 (Direct3D 10.0).

== History ==
On November 27, 2009, Nvidia released its first GeForce 300 series video card, the GeForce 310. However, this card is a re-brand of one of Nvidia's older models (the GeForce 210) and not based on the newer Fermi architecture.

On February 2, 2010, Nvidia announced the release of the GeForce GT 320, GT 330 and GT 340, available to OEMs only. The Geforce GT 340 is simply a rebadged GT 240, sharing exactly the same specifications, while the GT 320 and 330 were newer cards (albeit still based on the previous generation GT200b and G92b architecture).

The GeForce GT 340, holds a unique position in the history of graphics cards due to its relative rarity. Released primarily for Original Equipment Manufacturers (OEMs), the GT 340 wasn't widely available to general consumers, making it less common in the mainstream market. One intriguing aspect of the GT 340 is its unofficial rebranding by some enthusiasts. These modders took the original GT 340, enhanced its cooling capabilities, modified the BIOS, and overclocked it, creating what they termed the "GTX 340." This variant, although unofficial, became even rarer than the original due to its limited production and unique modifications.

== Chipset table ==
=== GeForce 300 (3xx) series ===
A table of desktop graphics card products is given below.

| Model | Launch | Code name | Fab (nm) | Transistors (million) | Die size (mm^{2}) | Bus interface | Core config (Note: Unified shaders: texture mapping units: render output units) | Clock rate | | | Fillrate | | Memory configuration | | | | Processing power (GFLOPS) (Note: To calculate the processing power see Tesla (microarchitecture)#Performance.) | TDP (Watts) | Comments |
| Model | Launch | Code name | Fab (nm) | Transistors (million) | Die size (mm^{2}) | Bus interface | Core config | Core (MHz) | Shader (MHz) | Memory (MHz) | Pixel (GP/s) | Texture (GT/s) | Size (MB) | Bandwidth (GB/s) | DRAM type | Bus width (bit) | Single precision | TDP (Watts) | Comments |
|---|---|---|---|---|---|---|---|---|---|---|---|---|---|---|---|---|---|---|---|
| GeForce 310 | November 27, 2009 | GT218 | TSMC 40 nm | 260 | 57 | PCIe 2.0 x16 | 16:8:4 | 589 | 1402 | 1000 | 2.356 | 4.712 | 512 | 8 | DDR2 | 64 | 44.8 | 30.5 | OEM Card, similar to Geforce 210 |
| GeForce 315 | February 2010 | GT216 | TSMC 40 nm | 486 | 100 | PCIe 2.0 x16 | 48:16:4 | 475 | 1100 | 1580 | 3.8 | 7.6 | 512 | 12.6 | DDR3 | 64 | 105.6 | 33 | OEM Card, similar to Geforce GT220 |
| GeForce GT 320 | February 2010 | GT215 | TSMC 40 nm | 727 | 144 | PCIe 2.0 x16 | 72:24:8 | 540 | 1302 | 1580 | 4.32 | 12.96 | 1024 | 25.3 | GDDR3 | 128 | 187.5 | 43 | OEM Card |
| GeForce GT 330 | February 2010 | GT215-301-A3 | TSMC 40 nm | 727 | 144 | PCIe 2.0 x16 | 96:32:8 | 550 | 1350 | | 4.40 | 17.60 | 512 | 32.00 | GDDR3 | 128 | 257.3 | 75 | Specifications vary depending on OEM, similar to GT230 v2. |
| GeForce GT 330 | February 2010 | G92 | TSMC 40 nm | 727 | 144 | PCIe 2.0 x16 | 96:32:8 | 500 | 1250 | | 4.000 | 24.00 | 256 | 51.20 | GDDR3 | 256 | 240.0 | 75 | Specifications vary depending on OEM, similar to GT230 v2. |
| GeForce GT 330 | February 2010 | G92B | TSMC 40 nm | 727 | 144 | PCIe 2.0 x16 | 96:32:16 | 500 | 1250 | | 8.000 | 24.00 | 1024 | 16.32 | DDR2 | 128 | 240.0 | 75 | Specifications vary depending on OEM, similar to GT230 v2. |
| GeForce GT 340 | February 2010 | GT215 | TSMC 40 nm | 727 | 144 | PCIe 2.0 x16 | 96:32:8 | 550 | 1340 | 3400 | | | 512; 1024 | 54.4 | GDDR5 | 128 | 257.3 | 69 | OEM Card, similar to GT240 |

=== GeForce 300M (3xxM) series ===
A table of notebook graphics card products and notebook integrated graphics is given below.

| Model | Launch | Code name | Fab (nm) | Bus interface | Clock speed | | | Core config (Note: Unified shaders: texture mapping units: render output units) | Memory | | | | Fillrate | | Processing power (GFLOPS) (Note: To calculate the processing power see Tesla (microarchitecture)#Performance.) | Supported API version | | TDP (Watts) |
| Model | Launch | Code name | Fab (nm) | Bus interface | Core (MHz) | Shader (MHz) | Memory (MHz) | Core config | Size (MiB) | Bandwidth (GB/s) | Bus type | Bus width (bit) | Pixel (GP/s) | Texture (GT/s) | Processing power (GFLOPS) | Direct3D | OpenGL | TDP (Watts) |
|---|---|---|---|---|---|---|---|---|---|---|---|---|---|---|---|---|---|---|
| GeForce 305M | January 10, 2010 | GT218 | 40 | PCIe 2.0 x16 | 525 | 1150 | 1400 | 16:8:4 | 512 | 11.2 | DDR3; GDDR3 | 64 | 2.1 | 4.2 | 55 | 10.1 | 3.3 | 14 |
| GeForce 310M | January 10, 2010 | GT218 | 40 | PCIe 2.0 x16 | 625 | 1530 | 1600 | 16:8:4 | 512 | 12.8 | DDR3; GDDR3 | 64 | 2.5 | 5 | 73 | 10.1 | 3.3 | 14 |
| GeForce 315M | January 5, 2011 | GT218 | 40 | PCIe 2.0 x16 | 606 | 1212 | 1600 | 16:8:4 | 512 | 12.8 | DDR3; GDDR3 | 64 | 2.42 | 4.85 | 58.18 | 10.1 | 3.3 | 14 |
| GeForce 320M | April 1, 2010 | MCP89 | 40 | PCIe 2.0 x16 | 450 | 950 | 1066 | 48:16:8 | 256 (shared w/ system memory) | 17.056 | DDR3 | 128 | 3.6 | 7.2 | 136.8 | 10.1 | 3.3 | 20 |
| GeForce GT 320M | January 21, 2010 | GT216 | 40 | PCIe 2.0 x16 | 500 | 1100 | 1580 | 24:8:8 | 1024 | 25.3 | DDR3; GDDR3 | 128 | 4 | 4 | 90 | 10.1 | 3.3 | 14 |
| GeForce GT 325M | January 10, 2010 | GT216 | 40 | PCIe 2.0 x16 | 450 | 990 | 1600 | 48:16:8 | 1024 | 25.6 | DDR3; GDDR3 | 128 | 3.6 | 7.2 | 142 | 10.1 | 3.3 | 23 |
| GeForce GT 330M | January 10, 2010 | GT216 | 40 | PCIe 2.0 x16 | 575 | 1265 | 1600 | 48:16:8 | 1024 | 25.6 | DDR3; GDDR3 | 128 | 4.6 | 9.2 | 182 | 10.1 | 3.3 | 23 |
| GeForce GT 335M | January 7, 2010 | GT215 | 40 | PCIe 2.0 x16 | 450 | 1080 | 1600 | 72:24:8 | 1024 | 25.6 | DDR3; GDDR3 | 128 | 3.6 | 10.8 | 233 | 10.1 | 3.3 | 28? |
| GeForce GTS 350M | January 7, 2010 | GT215 | 40 | PCIe 2.0 x16 | 500 | 1249 | 3200 | 96:32:8 | 1024 | 51.2 | DDR3; GDDR3; GDDR5 | 128 | 4 | 16 | 360 | 10.1 | 3.3 | 28 |
| GeForce GTS 360M | January 7, 2010 | GT215 | 40 | PCIe 2.0 x16 | 500 | 1436 | 3600 | 96:32:8 | 1024 | 57.6 | DDR3; GDDR3; GDDR5 | 128 | 4.4 | 17.6 | 413 | 10.1 | 3.3 | 38 |

== Support ==
Nvidia ceased driver support for the GeForce 300 series on April 1, 2016.

- Windows XP 32-bit & Media Center Edition: version 340.52 released on July 29, 2014; Download
- Windows XP 64-bit: version 340.52 released on July 29, 2014; Download
- Windows Vista, 7, 8, 8.1 32-bit: version 342.01 (WHQL) released on December 14, 2016; Download
- Windows Vista, 7, 8, 8.1 64-bit: version 342.01 (WHQL) released on December 14, 2016; Download
- Windows 10, 32-bit: version 342.01 (WHQL) released on December 14, 2016; Download
- Windows 10, 64-bit: version 342.01 (WHQL) released on December 14, 2016; Download

== See also ==
- GeForce 8 series
- GeForce 9 series
- GeForce 100 series
- GeForce 200 series
- GeForce 400 series
- GeForce 500 series
- GeForce 600 series
- Nvidia Quadro
- Nvidia Tesla
