= GeForce 100 series =

Series of GPUs by Nvidia

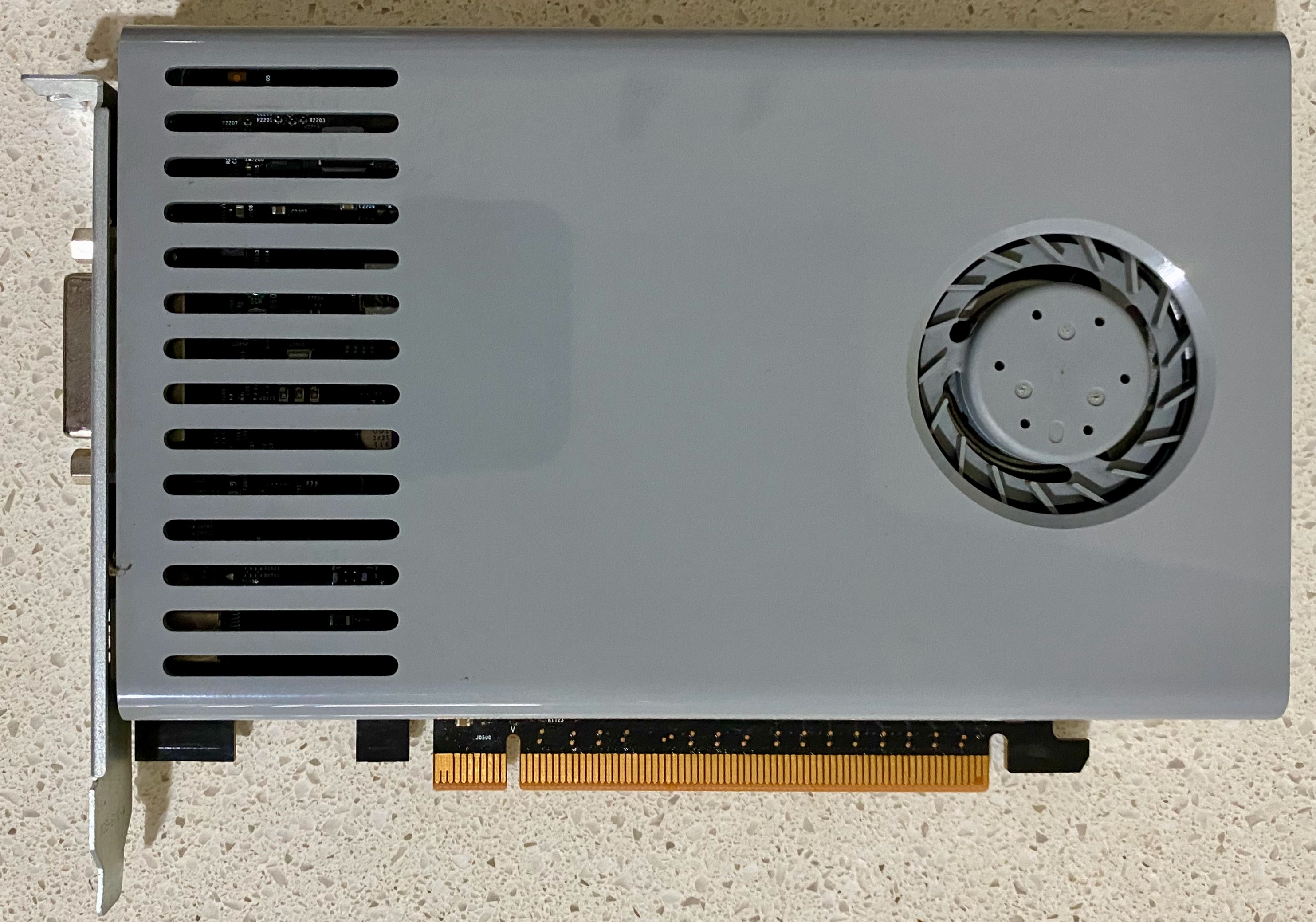
- GeForce GT120 for the Apple Mac Pro
- Release date: March 10, 2009; 17 years ago
- Codename: G9x
- Architecture: Tesla
- Models: GeForce G series: GeForce GT series; GeForce GTS series
- Transistors: 210M 65nm (G98): 314M 55nm (G96B); 505M 55nm (G94B); 754M 55nm (G92B)

Cards
- Entry-level: G100; GT 120
- Mid-range: GT 130; GT 140
- High-end: GTS 150

API support
- Direct3D: Direct3D 10.0; Shader Model 4.0
- OpenCL: OpenCL 1.1
- OpenGL: OpenGL 3.3

History
- Predecessor: GeForce 9 series
- Successor: GeForce 200 series

Support status
- Unsupported

The GeForce 100 series is a series of Tesla-based graphics processing units developed by Nvidia, first released in March 2009. The 100 series graphics cards are rebrands of GeForce 9 series cards, available only for OEMs. However, the GTS 150 was briefly available to consumers.

== Products ==
The GeForce 100 series cards include the G100, GT 120, GT 130, GT 140 and GTS 150. The GT 120 is based on the 9500 GT with improved thermal designs, while the GT 130 is based on the 9600 GSO (which itself was a rebadged 8800 GS). The GT 140 is simply a rebadged 9600 GT. The GTS 150 is an OEM version of the GTS 250 with some slight changes.

Despite being based upon previous 9 series cards, the G 100, GT 120, and GT 130 utilize entirely different PCBs and slightly different clock speeds.

Model	Year	Code name	Fab (nm)	Transistors (million)	Die size (mm^{2})	Bus interface	Core config	Reference clock rate			Fillrate		Reference memory configuration				API compliance (version)			GFLOPS^{2} (MADD+MUL)	TDP (Watts)	Prices (as of October 2009)
Model	Year	Code name	Fab (nm)	Transistors (million)	Die size (mm^{2})	Bus interface	Core config	Core (MHz)	Shader (MHz)	Memory (MHz)	Pixel (GP/s)	Texture (GT/s)	Size (MB)	Bandwidth (GB/s)	DRAM type	Bus width (bit)	Direct3D	OpenGL	Vulkan	GFLOPS^{2} (MADD+MUL)	TDP (Watts)	Prices (as of October 2009)
GeForce G100	March 10, 2009	G98	65	210	86	PCIe 2.0 x16	8:4:4	567	1400	500	4.3	4.3	512	8	DDR2	64	10	3.3	—N/a	~16	40	OEM
GeForce GT 120	March 10, 2009	G96B	55	314	121	PCIe 2.0 x16	32:16:8	500	1400	500	8	4	512	16	DDR2 GDDR3	128	10	3.3	—N/a	130	50	OEM
GeForce GT 130	March 10, 2009	G94B	55	505	196	PCIe 2.0 x16	48:24:16	500	1250	500	8	12	768	24	DDR2 GDDR3	192	10	3.3	—N/a	254	105	OEM
GeForce GT 140	March 10, 2009	G94B	55	505	196	PCIe 2.0 x16	64:32:16	650	1625	900	8	12	1024	57.6	GDDR3	256	10	3.3	—N/a	312	120	OEM
GeForce GTS 150	March 10, 2009	G92B	55	754	260	PCIe 2.0 x16	128:64:16	738	1836	1000	11.8	47.2	1024	64	GDDR3	256	10	3.3	—N/a	705	150	OEM

== Support ==
NVIDIA has ceased driver support for GeForce 100 series on April 1, 2016.

- Windows XP 32-bit & Media Center Edition: version 340.52 released on July 29, 2014; Download
- Windows XP 64-bit: version 340.52 released on July 29, 2014; Download
- Windows Vista, 7, 8, 8.1 32-bit: version 342.01 (WHQL) released on December 14, 2016; Download
- Windows Vista, 7, 8, 8.1 64-bit: version 342.01 (WHQL) released on December 14, 2016; Download
- Windows 10, 32-bit: version 342.01 (WHQL) released on December 14, 2016; Download
- Windows 10, 64-bit: version 342.01 (WHQL) released on December 14, 2016; Download

== See also ==
- GeForce 8 series
- GeForce 9 series
- GeForce 200 series
- GeForce 300 series
- GeForce 400 series
- GeForce 500 series
- GeForce 600 series
- Nvidia Quadro
- Nvidia Tesla
