= GeForce 200 series =

Series of GPUs by Nvidia

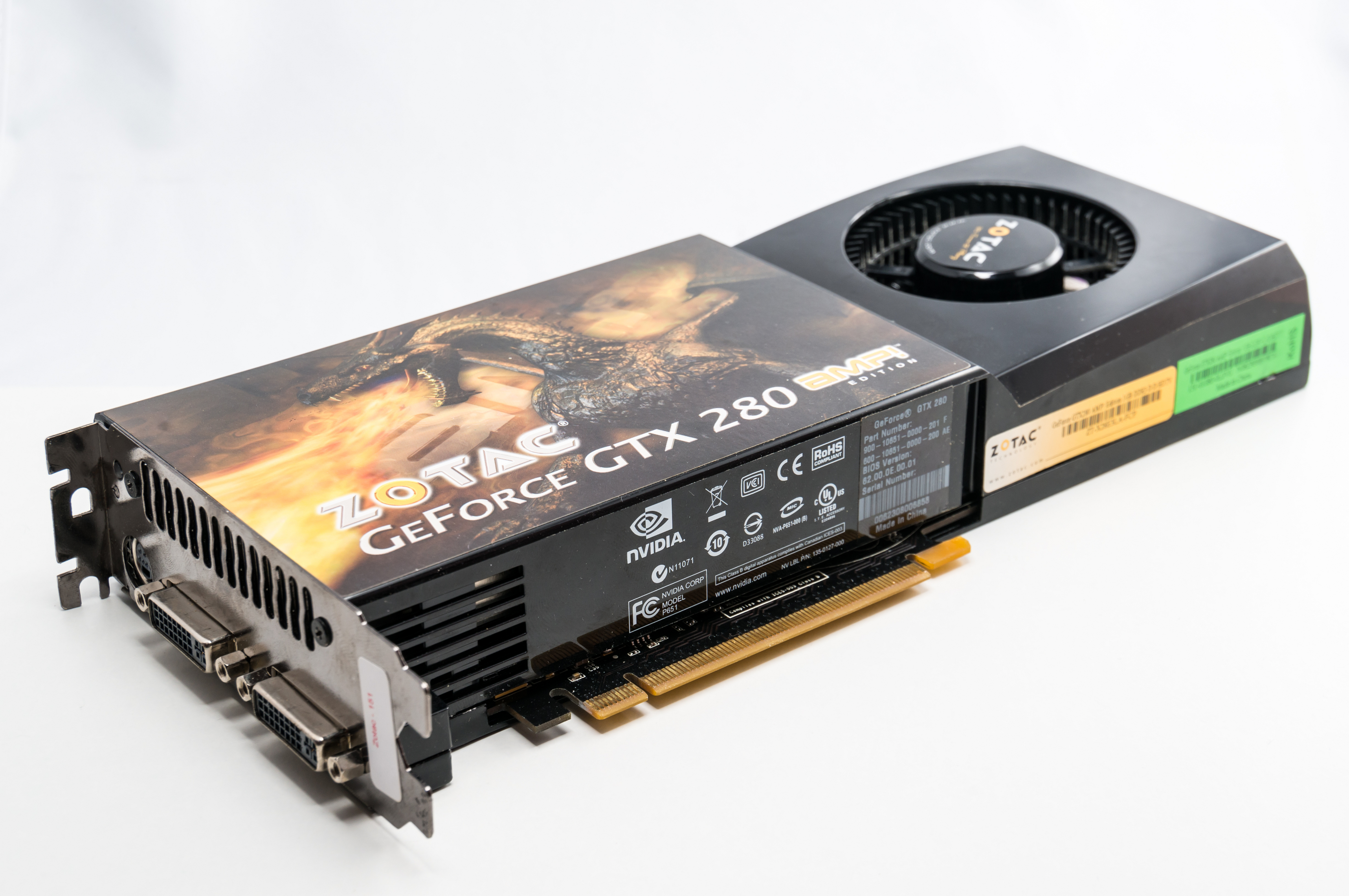
- A Nvidia GeForce GTX 280 released in 2008, a higher-end model of the series; this one from ZOTAC
- Release date: June 16, 2008; 18 years ago
- Codename: GT200
- Architecture: Tesla
- Models: GeForce series: GeForce GT series; GeForce GTS series; GeForce GTX series
- Transistors: 505M 55nm (G94b): 754M 55nm (G92b); 260M 40nm (GT218); 486M 40nm (GT216); 727M 40nm (GT215); 1,400M 65nm (GT200a); 1,400M 55nm (GT200b)

Cards
- Entry-level: 205; 210; G210; GT 220; GT 230
- Mid-range: GT 240; GTS 240; GTS 250
- High-end: GTX 260; GTX 275; GTX 280
- Enthusiast: GTX 285; GTX 295

API support
- Direct3D: Direct3D 10.0 or 10.1; Shader Model 4.1
- OpenCL: OpenCL 1.1
- OpenGL: OpenGL 3.3

History
- Predecessor: GeForce 9 series
- Variant: GeForce 300 series
- Successor: GeForce 400 series

Support status
- Unsupported

The GeForce 200 series is a series of Tesla-based GeForce graphics processing units developed by Nvidia. Introduced in 2008, it succeeded the GeForce 9 series. The series introduced Nvidia's second generation of the Tesla microarchitecture, the first major update to it since the GeForce 8 series.

== Architecture ==
The GeForce 200 series introduced Nvidia's second generation of the Tesla microarchitecture, Nvidia's unified shader architecture; the first major update to it since introduced with the GeForce 8 series.

The GeForce GTX 280 and GTX 260 are based on the same processor core. During the manufacturing process, GTX chips were binned and separated through defect testing of the core's logic functionality. Those that failed to meet the GTX 280 hardware specification were re-tested and binned as GTX 260 (which is specified with fewer stream processors, fewer ROPs and a narrower memory bus).

In late 2008, Nvidia re-released the GTX 260 with 216 stream processors, up from 192. Effectively, there were two GTX 260 cards in production with non-trivial performance differences.

The GeForce 200 series GPUs (GT200a/b GPU), excluding GeForce GTS 250, GTS 240 GPUs (these are older G92b GPUs), have double precision support for use in GPGPU applications. GT200 GPUs also have improved performance in geometry shading.

As of August 2018, the GT200 is the seventh largest commercial GPU ever constructed, consisting of 1.4 billion transistors covering a 576 mm^{2} die surface area built on a 65 nm process. It is the fifth largest CMOS-logic chip that has been fabricated at the TSMC foundry. The GeForce 400 series have since superseded the GT200 chips in transistor count, but the original GT200 dies still exceed the GF100 die size. It is larger than even the Kepler-based GK210 GPU used in the Tesla K80, which has 7.1 billion transistors on a 561 mm^{2} die manufactured in 28 nm. The Ampere GA100 is currently the largest commercial GPU ever fabricated at 826 mm^{2} with 54.2 billion transistors.

Nvidia officially announced and released the retail version of the previously OEM only GeForce 210 (GT218 GPU) and GeForce GT 220 (GT216 GPU) on October 12, 2009. Nvidia officially announced and released the GeForce GT 240 (GT215 GPU) on November 17, 2009. The new 40nm GPUs feature the new PureVideo HD VP4 decoder hardware in them, as the older GeForce 8 and 9 GPUs only have PureVideo HD VP2 or VP3 (G98). They also support Compute Capability 1.2, whereas older GeForce 8 and 9 GPUs only supported Compute Capability 1.1. All GT21x GPUs also contain an audio processor inside and support eight-channel LPCM output through HDMI.

== Chipset table ==
=== GeForce 200 series ===
All models support Coverage Sample Anti-Aliasing, Angle-Independent Anisotropic Filtering, 240-bit OpenEXR HDR.

- ^{1} Unified Shaders : Texture mapping units : Render output units
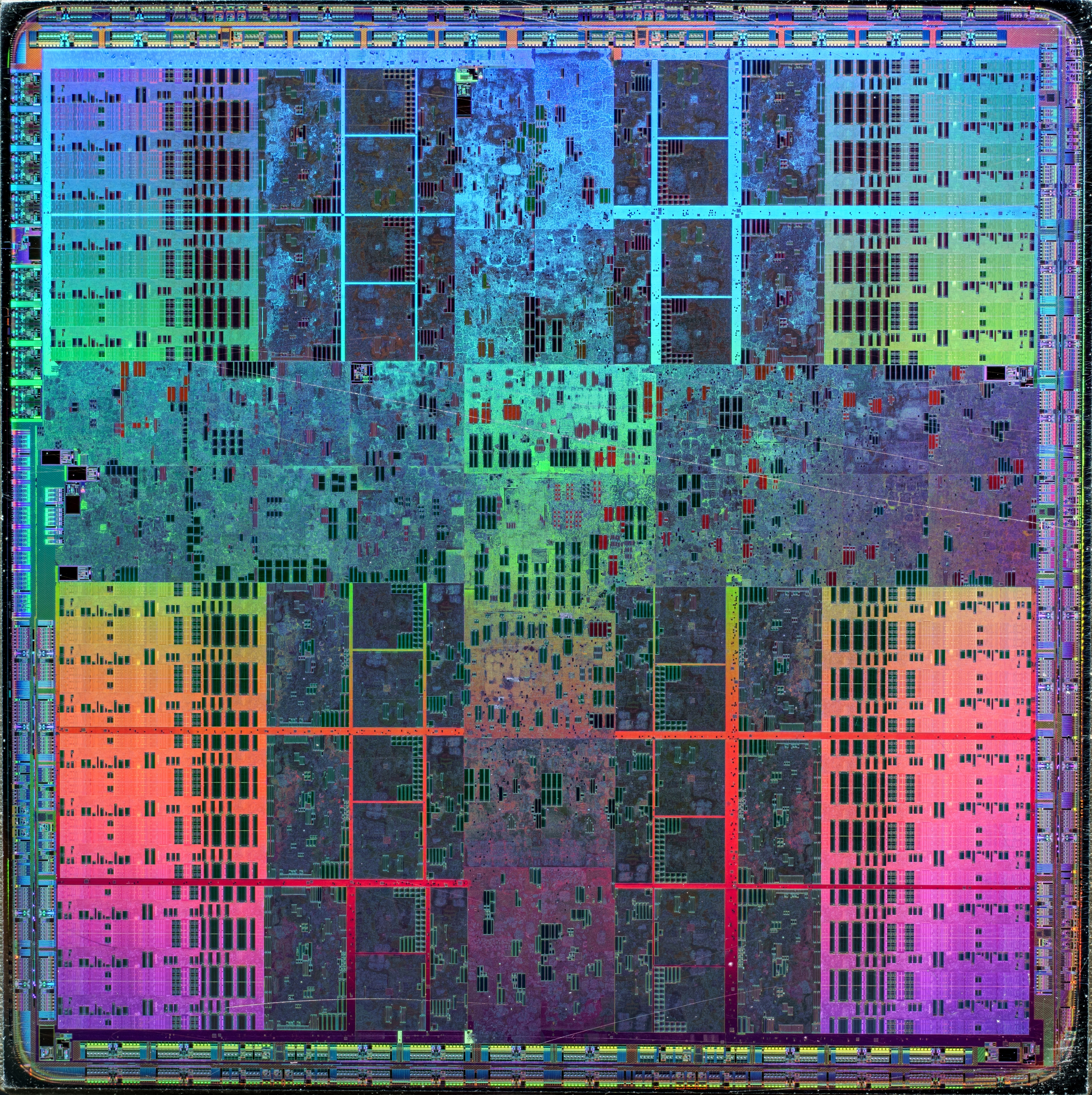
GeForce GTX 295 die (GT200-350-B3)

Model	Launch	Code name	Fab (nm)	Transistors (Million)	Die size (mm^{2})	Bus interface	Core config ^{1}	Clock rate			Fillrate		Memory configuration				API support (version)			Processing Power GFLOPS	TDP (watts)	Comments
Model	Launch	Code name	Fab (nm)	Transistors (Million)	Die size (mm^{2})	Bus interface	Core config ^{1}	Core (MHz)	Shader (MHz)	Memory (MHz)	Pixel (GP/s)	Texture (GT/s)	Size (MB)	Bandwidth (GB/s)	DRAM type	Bus width (bit)	DirectX	OpenGL	Vulkan	Processing Power GFLOPS	TDP (watts)	Comments
GeForce 205	November 26, 2009	GT218	40	260	57	PCIe 2.0 x16	8:4:4	589	1402	1000	2.356	2.356	512	8	DDR2	64	10.1	3.3	—N/a	33.4	30.5	OEM only
GeForce 210	October 12, 2009	GT218	40	260	57	PCIe 2.0 x16 PCIe x1 PCI	16:8:4	520; 589	1230; 1402	1000–1600	2.356	4.712	512; 1024	4.0; 8.0; 12.8	DDR2; DDR3	32; 64	10.1	3.3	—N/a	67.296	30.5	
GeForce GT 220	October 12, 2009	GT216	40	486	100	PCIe 2.0 x16	48:16:8	615(OEM); 625	1335(OEM); 1360	1000; 1580	5	10	512; 1024	16.0; 25.3	DDR2; DDR3	128	10.1	3.3	—N/a	192(OEM); 196	58	
GeForce GT 230 v.1	2009	G94b	55	505	196	PCIe 2.0 x16	48:24:16	650	1625	1800	10.4	15.6	512; 1024	57.6	GDDR3	256	10	3.3	—N/a	234	75	OEM only
GeForce GT 230 v.2	2009	G92b	55	754	260	PCIe 2.0 x16	96:48:12	500	1242	1000	6	24	1536	24	DDR2	192	10	3.3	—N/a	357.69	75	OEM only
GeForce GT 240	November 17, 2009	GT215	40	727	139	PCIe 2.0 x16	96:32:8	550	1340	1800; 2000; 3400(GDDR5)	4.4	17.6	512; 1024	28.8(OEM); 32; 54.4(GDDR5)	DDR3; GDDR3; GDDR5	128	10.1	3.3	—N/a	385.9	69	
GeForce GTS 240	Q4 2009	G92a; G92b	65; 55	754	324; 260	PCIe 2.0 x16	112:56:16	675	1620	2200	10.8	37.8	1024	70.4	GDDR3	256	10.0	3.3	—N/a	554.32	120	OEM only
GeForce GTS 250 Green	2009	G92b	65; 55	754	260	PCIe 2.0 x16	128:64:16	702	1512	2000	11.2	44.9	512; 1024	64.0	GDDR3	256	10.0	3.3	—N/a	581	130	
GeForce GTS 250	March 3, 2009	G92-428-B1	65; 55	754	260	PCIe 2.0 x16	128:64:16	738	1836	2000; 2200	11.808	47.232	512; 1024	64.0; 70.4	GDDR3	256	10.0	3.3	—N/a	705.024	150	Some cards are rebranded GeForce 9800 GTX+
GeForce GTX 260	June 16, 2008	GT200-100-A2	65	1400	576	PCIe 2.0 x16	192:64:28	576	1242	1998	16.128	36.864	896 (1792)	111.9	GDDR3	448	10.0	3.3	—N/a	715.392	202	Replaced by GTX 260 Core 216
GeForce GTX 260 Core 216	September 16, 2008	GT200-103-A2; GT200-105-B3	65; 55	1400	576; 470	PCIe 2.0 x16	216:72:28	576	1242	1998	16.128	41.472	896 (1792)	111.9	GDDR3	448	10.0	3.3	—N/a	804.816; 874.8	182; 171	
GeForce GTX 275	April 9, 2009	GT200-400-B3	55	1400	470	PCIe 2.0 x16	240:80:28	633	1404	2268	17.724	50.6	896	127.0	GDDR3	448	10.0	3.3	—N/a	1010.880	219	Effectively one-half of the GTX 295
GeForce GTX 280	June 17, 2008	GT200-300-A2	65	1400	576	PCIe 2.0 x16	240:80:32	602	1296	2214	19.264	48.16	1024 (2048*)	141.7	GDDR3	512	10.0	3.3	—N/a	933.120	236	MSI launched a 2GB version. Replaced by GTX 285
GeForce GTX 285	January 15, 2009	GT200-350-B3	55	1400	470	PCIe 2.0 x16	240:80:32	648	1476	2484	20.736	51.84	1024 (2048*)	159.0	GDDR3	512	10.0	3.3	—N/a	1062.72	204	Palit, EVGA and BFG launched 2GB versions. EVGA GTX285 Classified can support 4-way SLI
GeForce GTX 295	January 8, 2009	2× GT200-400-B3	55	2× 1400	2× 470	PCIe 2.0 x16	2× 240:80:28	576	1242	1998	2× 16.128	2× 46.08	2× 896	2× 111.9	GDDR3	2× 448	10.0	3.3	—N/a	1788.480	289	Dual PCB models were phased out in favor of a single PCB model with 2 GPUs
Model	Launch	Code name	Fab (nm)	Transistors (Million)	Die size (mm^{2})	Bus interface	Core config ^{1}	Clock rate			Fillrate		Memory configuration				API support (version)			Processing Power GFLOPS	TDP (watts)	Comments
Model	Launch	Code name	Fab (nm)	Transistors (Million)	Die size (mm^{2})	Bus interface	Core config ^{1}	Core (MHz)	Shader (MHz)	Memory (MHz)	Pixel (GP/s)	Texture (GT/s)	Size (MB)	Bandwidth (GB/s)	DRAM type	Bus width (bit)	DirectX	OpenGL	Vulkan	Processing Power GFLOPS	TDP (watts)	Comments

==== Features ====
Compute Capability: 1.1 (G92 [GTS250] GPU)
Compute Capability: 1.2 (GT215, GT216, GT218 GPUs)
Compute Capability: 1.3 has double precision support for use in GPGPU applications. (GT200a/b GPUs only)

Model	Features		
Model	Scalable Link Interface (SLI)	PureVideo 2 with VP2 Engine: (BSP and 240 AES)	PureVideo 4 with VP4 Engine
GeForce 210	No	No	Yes
GeForce GT 220	No	No	Yes
GeForce GT 240	No	No	Yes
GeForce GTS 250	Yes; 3-Way (4-way for EVGA 285 Classified)	Yes	No
GeForce GTX 260	Yes; 3-Way (4-way for EVGA 285 Classified)	Yes	No
GeForce GTX 260 Core 216	Yes; 3-Way (4-way for EVGA 285 Classified)	Yes	No
GeForce GTX 260 Core 216 (55 nm)	Yes; 3-Way (4-way for EVGA 285 Classified)	Yes	No
GeForce GTX 275	Yes; 3-Way (4-way for EVGA 285 Classified)	Yes	No
GeForce GTX 280	Yes; 3-Way (4-way for EVGA 285 Classified)	Yes	No
GeForce GTX 285	Yes; 3-Way (4-way for EVGA 285 Classified)	Yes	No
GeForce GTX 295	Yes	Yes	No

=== GeForce 200M (2xxM) Series ===
The GeForce 200M Series is a graphics processor architecture for notebooks.

- ^{1} Unified Shaders : Texture mapping units : Render output units

Model	Launch	Code name	Fab (nm)	Bus interface	Core config^{1}	Clock speed			Fillrate		Memory				API support (version)			Processing Power (GFLOPS)	TDP (watts)	Notes
Model	Launch	Code name	Fab (nm)	Bus interface	Core config^{1}	Core (MHz)	Shader (MHz)	Memory (MHz)	Pixel (GP/s)	Texture (GT/s)	Size (MiB)	Bandwidth (GB/s)	Bus type	Bus width (bit)	DirectX	OpenGL	Vulkan	Processing Power (GFLOPS)	TDP (watts)	Notes
GeForce G210M	June 15, 2009	GT218	40	PCIe 2.0 x16	16:8:4	625	1500	1600	2.5	5	512	12.8	GDDR3	64	10.1	3.3	—N/a	72	14	Lower clocked versions of the GT218 core is also known as Nvidia ION 2
GeForce GT 220M	2009	G96b	55	PCIe 2.0 x16	32:16:8	500	1250	1000; 1600	4	8	1024	16; 25.6	DDR2; GDDR3	128	10.0	3.3	—N/a	120	14	Rebranded 9600M GT @55 nm node shrink
GeForce GT 230M	June 15, 2009	GT216	40	PCIe 2.0 x16	48:16:8	500	1100	1600	4	8	1024	25.6	GDDR3	128	10.1	3.3	—N/a	158	23	
GeForce GT 240M	June 15, 2009	GT216	40	PCIe 2.0 x16	48:16:8	550	1210	1600	4.4	8.8	1024	25.6	GDDR3	128	10.1	3.3	—N/a	174	23	
GeForce GTS 250M	June 15, 2009	GT215	40	PCIe 2.0 x16	96:32:8	500	1250	3200	4	16	1024	51.2	GDDR5	128	10.1	3.3	—N/a	360	28	
GeForce GTS 260M	June 15, 2009	GT215	40	PCIe 2.0 x16	96:32:8	550	1375	3600	4.4	17.6	1024	57.6	GDDR5	128	10.1	3.3	—N/a	396	38	
GeForce GTX 260M	March 3, 2009	G92b	55	PCIe 2.0 x16	112:56:16	550	1375	1900	8.8	30.8	1024	60.8	GDDR3	256	10.0	3.3	—N/a	462	65	
GeForce GTX 280M	March 3, 2009	G92b	55	PCIe 2.0 x16	128:64:16	585	1463	1900	9.36	37.44	1024	60.8	GDDR3	256	10.0	3.3	—N/a	562	75	
GeForce GTX 285M	February 1, 2010	G92b	55	PCIe 2.0 x16	128:64:16	600	1500	2000	9.6	38.4	1024	64.0	GDDR3	256	10.0	3.3	—N/a	576	75	Higher clocked version of GTX280M with improved memory
Model	Launch	Code name	Fab (nm)	Bus interface	Core config^{1}	Clock speed			Fillrate		Memory				API support (version)			Processing Power (GFLOPS)	TDP (watts)	Notes
Model	Launch	Code name	Fab (nm)	Bus interface	Core config^{1}	Core (MHz)	Shader (MHz)	Memory (MHz)	Pixel (GP/s)	Texture (GT/s)	Size (MiB)	Bandwidth (GB/s)	Bus type	Bus width (bit)	DirectX	OpenGL	Vulkan	Processing Power (GFLOPS)	TDP (watts)	Notes

== Support ==
Nvidia ceased driver support for GeForce 200 series on April 1, 2016.

- Windows XP 32-bit & Media Center Edition: version 340.52 released on July 29, 2014; Download
- Windows XP 64-bit: version 340.52 released on July 29, 2014; Download
- Windows Vista, 7, 8, 8.1 32-bit: version 342.01 (WHQL) released on December 14, 2016; Download
- Windows Vista, 7, 8, 8.1 64-bit: version 342.01 (WHQL) released on December 14, 2016; Download
- Windows 10, 32-bit: version 342.01 (WHQL) released on December 14, 2016; Download
- Windows 10, 64-bit: version 342.01 (WHQL) released on December 14, 2016; Download
- Linux, 64-bit: version 340.108 released on December 23, 2019; Download

== Gallery ==
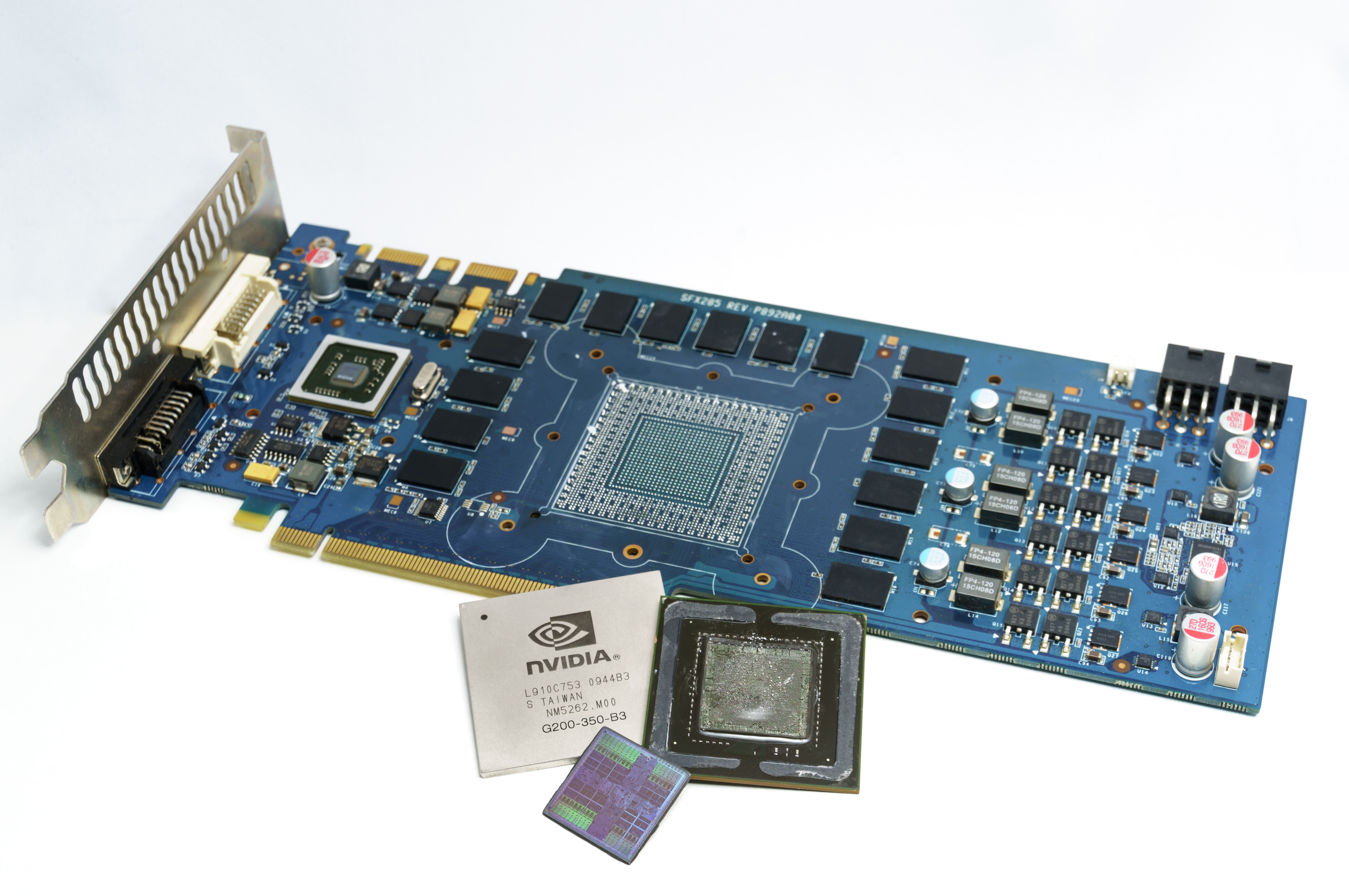
Nvidia GeForce GTX 285, displaying PCB, die and de-lidded heat-spreader

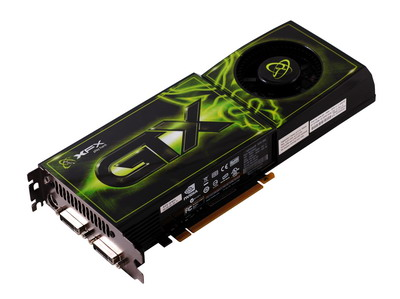
Nvidia GeForce GTX 260, manufactured by NVIDIA board-partner XFX

Nvidia GeForce GTX 280, manufactured by NVIDIA board-partner ASUS

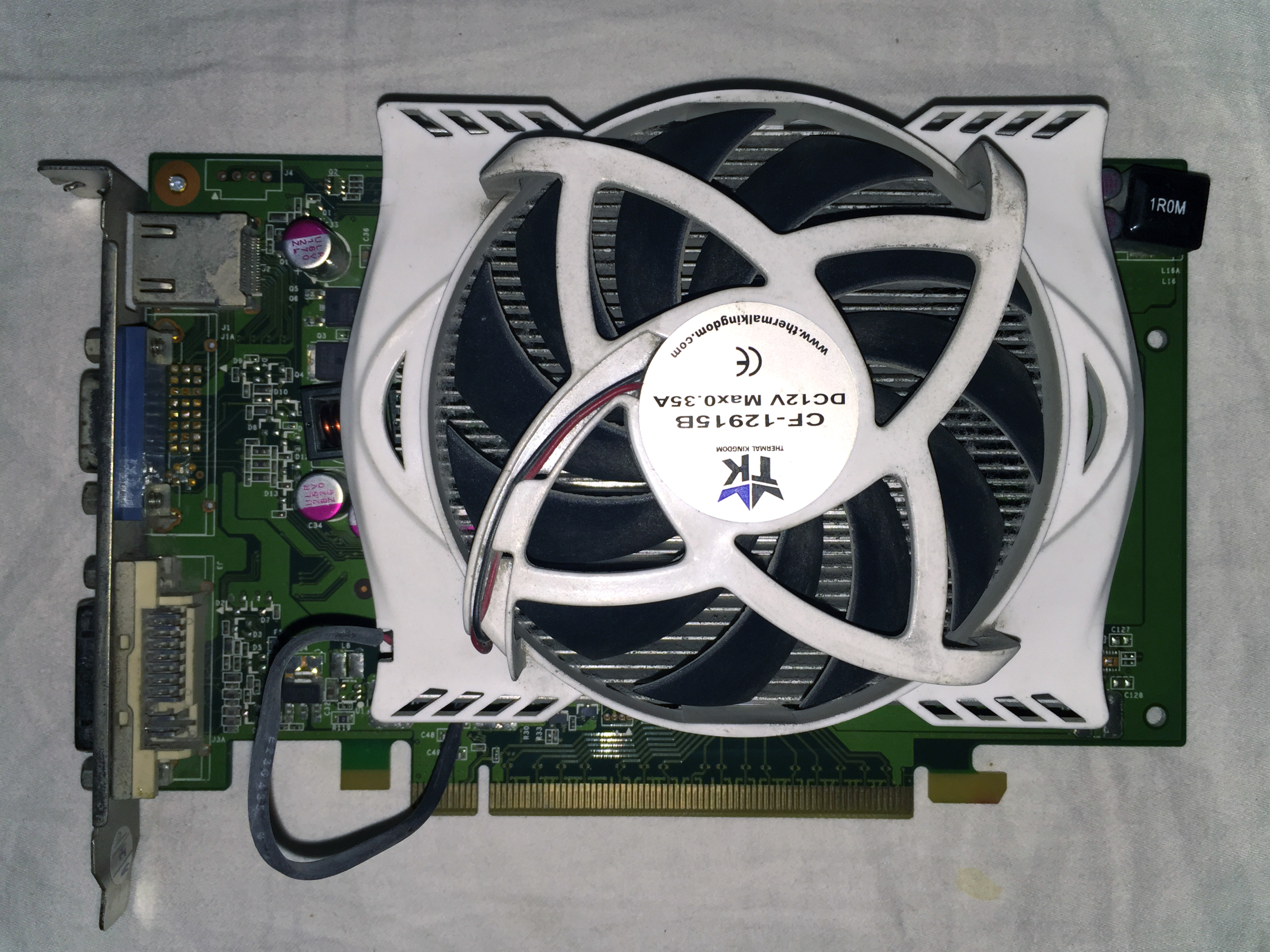
Nvidia GeForce GT 240, manufactured by NVIDIA board-partner Inno3D

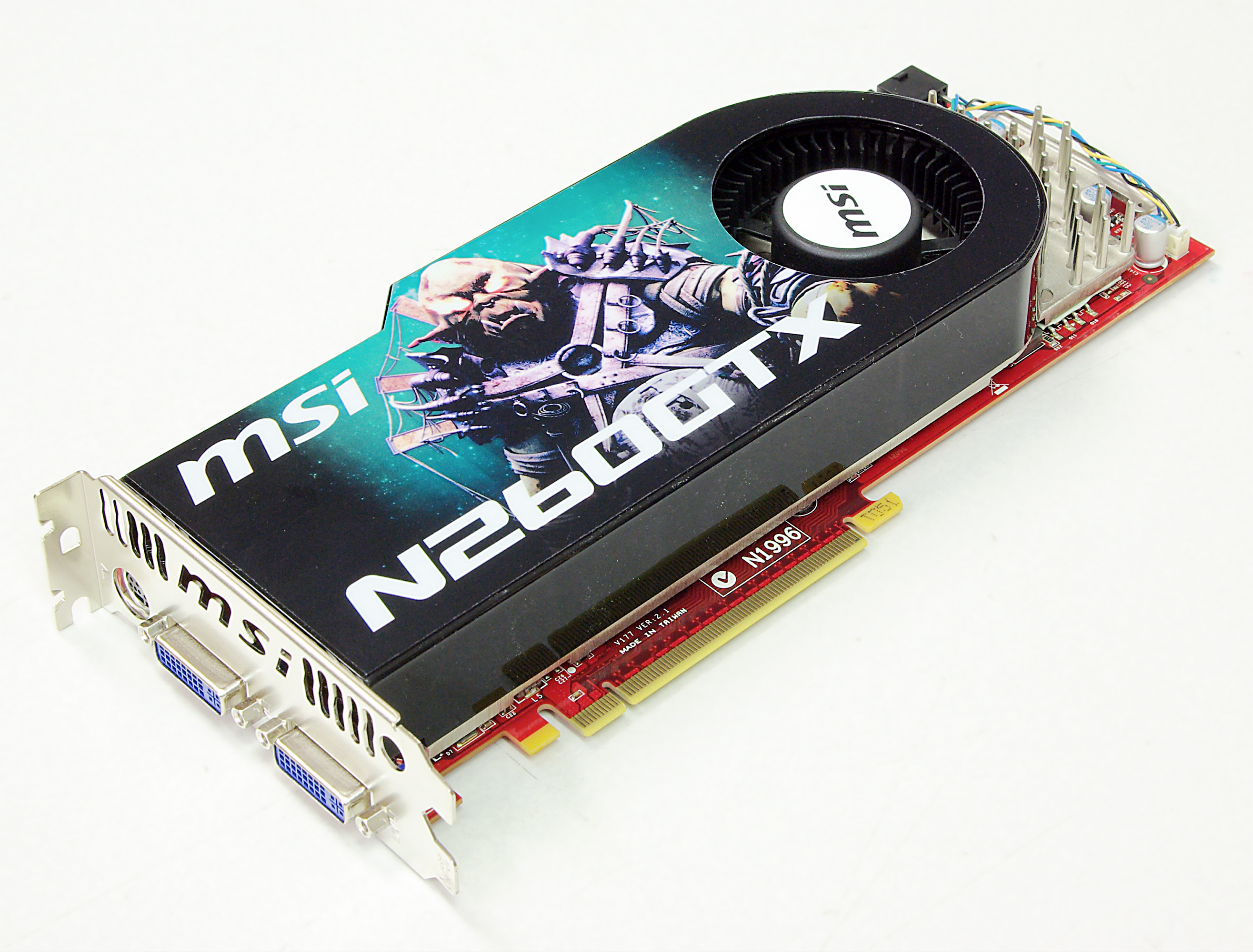
Nvidia GeForce GTX 260, manufactured by NVIDIA board-partner MSI

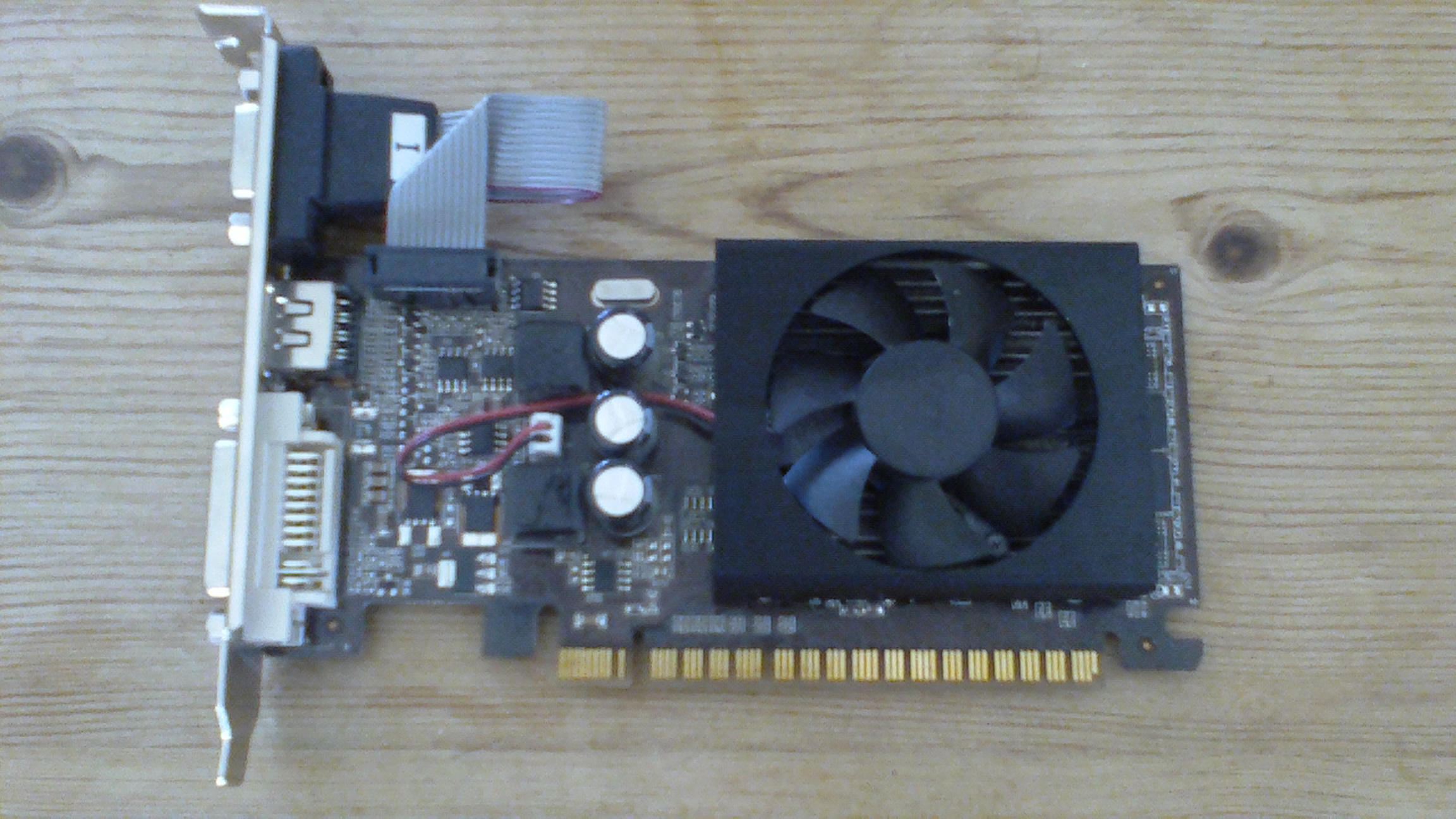
Nvidia GeForce 210, manufactured by NVIDIA board-partner PNY

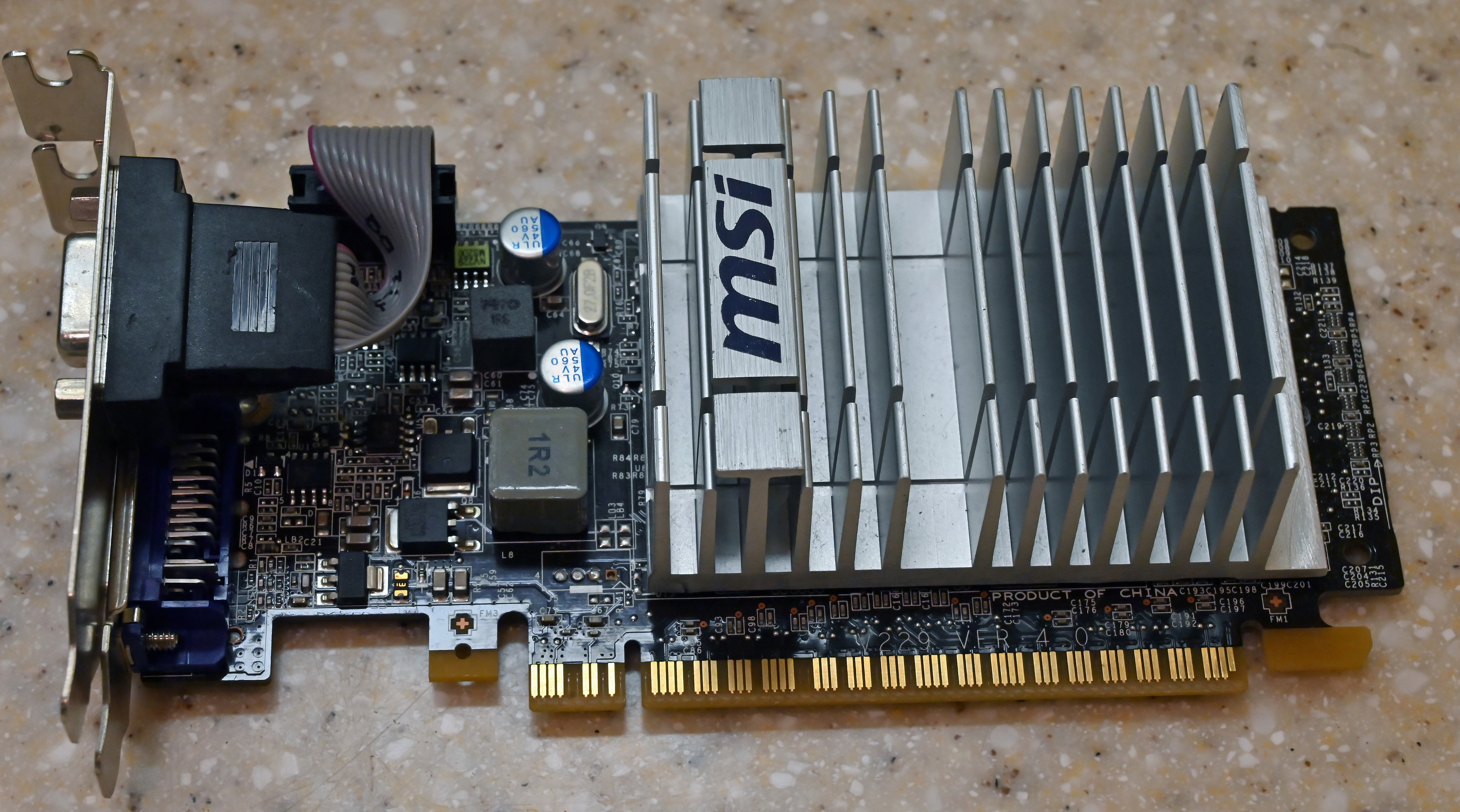
A half-height 210 by MSI

== See also ==
- GeForce 8 series
- GeForce 9 series
- GeForce 100 series
- GeForce 300 series
- GeForce 400 series
- GeForce 500 series
- GeForce 600 series
- GeForce 700 series
- GeForce 800M series
- GeForce 900 series
- GeForce 10 series
- Nvidia Quadro
- Nvidia Tesla
- List of Nvidia graphics processing units
