= Quadro =

Brand of Nvidia graphics cards used in workstations

- Release date: January 1, 2000; 26 years ago
- Discontinued: October 5, 2020; 5 years ago

History
- Successor: Nvidia RTX PRO

Quadro was Nvidia's brand for graphics cards intended for use in workstations running professional computer-aided design (CAD), computer-generated imagery (CGI), digital content creation (DCC) applications, scientific calculations and machine learning from 2000 to 2020.

Quadro-branded graphics cards differed from the mainstream GeForce lines in that the Quadro cards included the use of ECC memory, larger GPU cache, and enhanced floating point precision. These are desirable properties when the cards are used for calculations which require greater reliability and precision compared to graphics rendering for video games.

The Nvidia Quadro product line directly competed with AMD's Radeon Pro (formerly FirePro/FireGL) line of professional workstation graphics cards.

Nvidia has since moved away from the Quadro branding for new products, starting with the Turing architecture-based RTX 4000 released on November 13, 2018, and then phasing it out entirely with launch of the Ampere architecture-based RTX A6000 on October 5, 2020. To indicate the upgrade to the Nvidia Ampere architecture for their graphics cards technology, Nvidia RTX is the product line being produced and developed moving forward for use in professional workstations. This branding lasted until the beginning of the Blackwell architecture era in 2025, when the workstation graphics card line was rebranded to RTX PRO in order to distinguish it further from the gaming-oriented GeForce RTX line.

== History ==
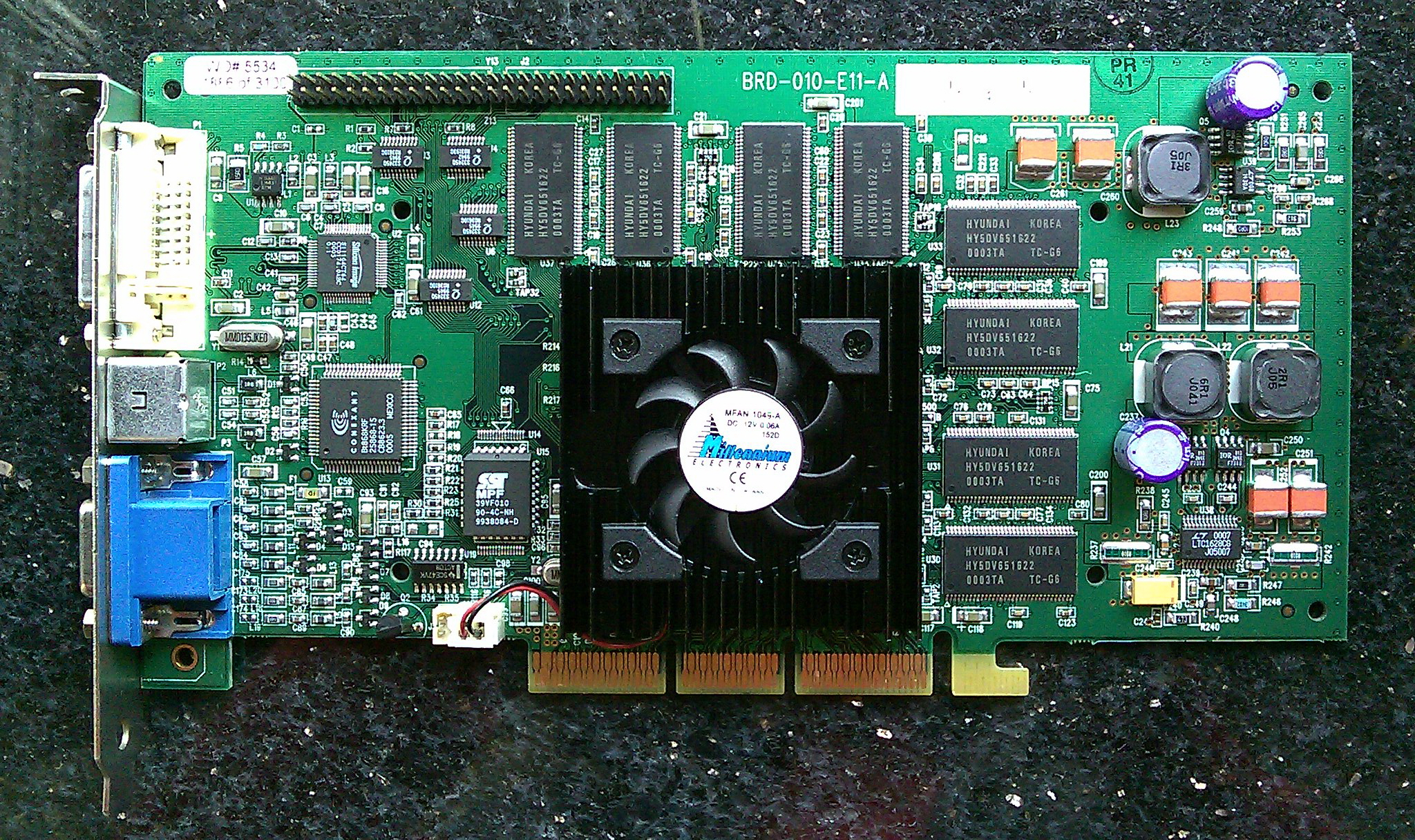
Quadro DIV Vpro VR3

The Quadro line of GPU cards emerged in an effort towards market segmentation by Nvidia. In introducing Quadro, Nvidia was able to charge a premium for essentially the same graphics hardware in professional markets, and direct resources to properly serve the needs of those markets. To differentiate their offerings, Nvidia used driver software and firmware to selectively enable features vital to segments of the workstation market, such as high-performance anti-aliased lines and two-sided lighting, in the Quadro product. These features were of little value to the gamers that Nvidia's products already sold to, but their lack prevented high-end customers from using the less expensive products. The Quadro line also received improved support through a certified driver program.

There are parallels between the market segmentation used to sell the Quadro line of products to workstation (DCC) markets and the Tesla line of products to engineering and HPC markets.

In a settlement of a patent infringement lawsuit between SGI and Nvidia, SGI acquired rights to speed-binned Nvidia graphics chips which they shipped under the VPro product label. These designs were completely separate from the SGI Odyssey based VPro products initially sold on their IRIX workstations which used a completely different bus. SGI's Nvidia-based VPro line included the VPro V3 (Geforce 256), VPro VR3 (Quadro), VPro V7 (Quadro2 MXR), and VPro VR7 (Quadro2 Pro).

== Quadro SDI ==
Actual extra cards only for Quadro 4000 cards and higher:

- SDI Capture:
- SDI Output:

== Quadro Plex ==
Quadro Plex consists of a line of external servers for rendering videos. A Quadro Plex contains multiple Quadro FX video cards. A client computer connects to Quadro Plex (using PCI Express ×8 or ×16 interface card with interconnect cable) to initiate rendering.

== Quadro SLI and Sync ==
Scalable Link Interface, or SLI, has been considered as the next generation of Plex. Originally used for the GeForce line of graphics cards, it is a multi-GPU technology that uses two or more video cards to produce a single output. SLI can improve Frame Rendering and FSAA. Quadro SLI supports Mosaic technology for multiple displays using two cards in parallel and up to 8 possible monitors. Most cards have an SLI bridge slot for up to four cards on one motherboard. With Quadro Sync technology, cards can support up to a maximum of 16 possible monitors (using four cards in parallel).

Nvidia has four types of SLI bridges:

- Standard Bridge (400 MHz Pixel Clock and 1 GB/s bandwidth)
- LED Bridge (540 MHz Pixel Clock)
- High-Bandwidth Bridge (650 MHz Pixel Clock)
- PCI-e lanes only reserved for SLI

In both SLI and SYNC technologies, acceleration of scientific calculations is possible with CUDA and OpenCL.

== Quadro VCA ==
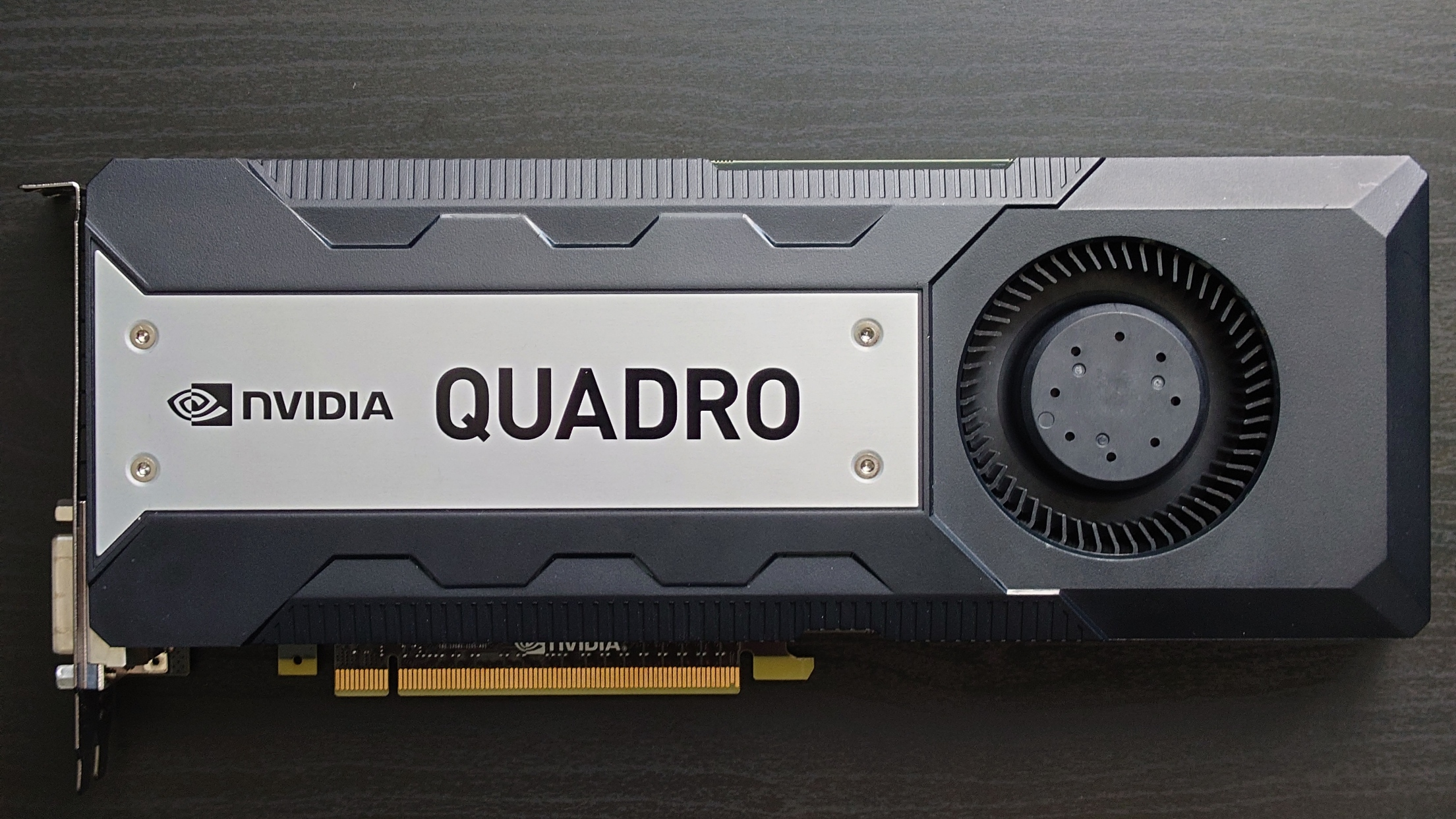
A Nvidia Quadro K6000, released in 2013

Nvidia supports SLI and supercomputing with its 8-GPU Visual Computing Appliance. Nvidia Iray, Chaosgroup V-Ray and Nvidia OptiX accelerate Raytracing for Maya, 3DS Max, Cinema4D, Rhinoceros and others. All software with CUDA or OpenCL, such as ANSYS, NASTRAN, ABAQUS, and OpenFoam, can benefit from VCA. The DGX-1 is available with 8 GP100 Cards.

== Quadro RTX ==
The Quadro RTX series is based on the Turing microarchitecture, and features real-time raytracing. This is accelerated by the use of new RT cores, which are designed to process quadtrees and spherical hierarchies, and speed up collision tests with individual triangles. The Turing microarchitecture debuted with the Quadro RTX series before the mainstream consumer GeForce RTX line.

The raytracing performed by the RT cores can be used to produce reflections, refractions and shadows, replacing traditional raster techniques such as cube maps and depth maps. Instead of replacing rasterization entirely, however, the information gathered from ray-tracing can be used to augment the shading with information that is much more physically correct, especially regarding off-camera action.

Tensor cores further enhance the image produced by raytracing, and are used to de-noise a partially rendered image.

RTX is also the name of the development platform introduced for the Quadro RTX series. RTX leverages Microsoft's DXR, OptiX and Vulkan for access to raytracing.

Turing is manufactured using TSMC's 12 nm FinFET fabrication process. Quadro RTX also uses GDDR6 memory from Samsung Electronics.

== Video cards ==
=== GeForce ===
Many of the Quadro line of video cards use the same GPU cores as Nvidia's consumer-and-gaming-oriented GeForce brand of video cards. The cards that are nearly identical to the desktop cards can be modified to identify themselves as the equivalent Quadro card to the operating system, allowing optimized drivers intended for the Quadro cards to be installed on the system. While this may not offer all of the performance of the equivalent Quadro card, it can improve performance in certain applications, but may require installing the MAXtreme driver for comparable speed.

The performance difference comes in the firmware controlling the card. Given the importance of speed in a game, a system used for gaming can shut down textures, shading, or rendering after only approximating a final output—in order to keep the overall frame rate high. The algorithms on a CAD-oriented card tend rather to complete all rendering operations, even if that introduces delays or variations in the timing, prioritising accuracy and rendering quality over speed. A Geforce card focuses more on texture fillrates and high framerates with lighting and sound, but Quadro cards prioritize wireframe rendering and object interactions.

== Desktop AGP ==
- Architecture Celsius (NV1x): DirectX 7, OpenGL 1.2 (1.3)
- Architecture Kelvin (NV2x): DirectX 8 (8.1), OpenGL 1.3 (1.5), Pixel Shader 1.1 (1.3)
- Architecture Rankine (NV3x): DirectX 9.0a, OpenGL 1.5 (2.1), Shader Model 2.0a
- Architecture Curie (NV4x): DirectX 9.0c, OpenGL 2.1, Shader Model 3.0

Quadro_AGP Model	Launch	Core	Core clock	Memory clock (effective)	Memory size	Memory type	Memory bandwidth	Interface AGP	3-pin stereo connector	Monitor Output	Near GeForce Model	Notes
Units			MHz	MHz	MB		GiB/s					
GeForce 256-based
Quadro	2000-01-01	NV10GL (Celsius)	135	166	32	128-bit SDR	2.66	4×	No	1× VGA	GeForce 256	
GeForce 2-based
Quadro2 Pro	2000-07-25	NV15GL	250	400	64	128-bit DDR	6.4	4×	No	DVI, VGA, S-Video	GeForce 2 GTS	
Quadro2 MXR	2000-07-25	NV11GL	200	183	32	128-bit SDR	2.93	4×	No	1× VGA	GeForce 2 MX/400	
Quadro2 MXR LP	2000-07-25	NV11GL	200	183	32	128-bit SDR	2.93	4x	No	1× VGA	GeForce 2 MX/400	
GeForce 3-based
Quadro DCC	2001-03-14	NV20GL (Kelvin)	200	230	64	128-bit DDR	7.3	4×	No	DVI, VGA, S-Video	GeForce 3/Ti	
GeForce 4-based
Quadro4 380 XGL	2002-11-12	NV18GL	275	513	64	128-bit DDR	8.2	8×	No	DVI, VGA, S-Video	GeForce 4 MX 440 (AGP 8×)	
Quadro4 500 XGL	2002-02-19	NV17GL	250	166	128	128-bit SDR	2.66	4 x	No	DVI	GeForce 4 MX 420	
Quadro4 550 XGL	2002-02-19	NV17GL	270	400	64	128-bit DDR	6.4	4×	No	DVI	GeForce 4 MX 440	
Quadro4 580 XGL	2002-11-12	NV18GL	300	400	64	128-bit DDR	6.4	8×	No	DVI	GeForce 4 MX 440 (AGP 8×)	
Quadro4 700 XGL	2002-02-19	NV25GL	275	550	64	128-bit DDR	7.2	4×	No	2× DVI, S-Video	GeForce 4 Ti 4200	
Quadro4 750 XGL	2002-02-19	NV25GL	275	550	128	128-bit DDR	7.2	4×	Yes	2× DVI, S-Video	GeForce 4 Ti 4400	
Quadro4 780 XGL	2002-11-12	NV28GL	275	550	128	128-bit DDR	8.8	4x	Yes	2× DVI, S-Video	GeForce 4 Ti 4200 (AGP 8×)	
Quadro4 900 XGL	2002-02-19	NV25GL	300	650	128	128-bit DDR	10.4	4×	Yes	2× DVI, S-Video	GeForce 4 Ti 4600	
Quadro4 980 XGL	2002-11-12	NV28GL	300	650	128	128-bit DDR	10.4	8×	Yes	2× DVI, S-Video	GeForce 4 Ti 4800	
GeForce FX-based
Quadro FX 500	2003-05-21	NV34GL (Rankine)	270	243	128	128-bit DDR	7.7	8×	No	DVI, VGA	GeForce FX 5200	
Quadro FX 700	2004-03-17	NV31GL	275	275	128	128-bit DDR	8.8	8×	No	DVI, VGA	GeForce FX 5600	
Quadro FX 1000	2003-01-21	NV30GL	300	600	128	128-bit GDDR2	9.6	8×	Yes	2× DVI, S-Video	GeForce FX 5800	
Quadro FX 1100	2004-04-01	NV36GL	425	325	128	128-bit DDR	10.4	8×	Yes	2× DVI, S-Video	GeForce FX 5700	
Quadro FX 2000	2003-01-21	NV30GL	400	400	128	128-bit GDDR2	12.8	8×	Yes	2× DVI, S-Video	GeForce FX 5800	
Quadro FX 3000	2003-07-22	NV35GL	400	425	256	256-bit DDR	27.2	8×	Yes	2× DVI, S-Video	GeForce FX 5900	
Quadro FX 3000G	2003-07-22	NV35GL	400	425	256	256-bit DDR	27.2	8×	Yes	2× DL-DVI (via external controller), S-Video	GeForce FX 5900	has external stereo frame sync connector
GeForce 6-based
Quadro FX 4000	2004-04-01	NV40GL	375	500	256	256-bit GDDR3	32.0	8×	Yes	2× Dual-link DVI, S-Video	GeForce 6800 GT	2nd link using external TMDS transmitter
Quadro FX 4000 SDI	2004-04-19	NV40GL (Curie)	375	500	256	256-bit GDDR3	32.0	8×	Yes	DVI, 2× SDI HDTV	GeForce 6800 GT	with digital and analog genlock (using external controllers)

== Desktop PCI ==
- Architecture Rankine (NV3x): DirectX 9.0a, OpenGL 1.5 (2.1), Shader Model 2.0a

Quadro PCI Model	Launch	Core	Core clock (MHz)	Memory clock (effective) (MHz)	Memory size (MB)	Memory type	Memory bandwidth (GB/s)	3-pin stereo connector	Monitor Output	Near GeForce Model	Notes
GeForce FX-based
Quadro FX 600 PCI	2004-03-17	NV34GL (Rankine)	270	480	128	128-bit DDR	7.8	Yes	2× DVI, S-Video	GeForce 5200 Ultra	

== Desktop PCI Express ==
=== Quadro FX (without CUDA, OpenCL, or Vulkan) ===
- Rankine (NV3x): DirectX 9.0a, Shader Model 2.0a, OpenGL 2.1
- Curie (NV4x, G7x): DirectX 9.0c, Shader Model 3.0, OpenGL 2.1

Quadro_FX PCIe Model	Launch	Core	Core clock	Memory clock (eff.)	Memory size (MB)	Memory type	Memory bandwidth	Pixel Rate	Texture Rate	Open GL	CUDA OpenCL	Vulkan	Power max.	3-pin stereo connector	Monitor Output	Near GeForce Model	Notes
Units			MHz	MHz	MB		GiB/s	GP/s	GT/s				Watt				
Quadro FX 330	2004-06-28	NV35GL (Rankine)	250	200 (400)	64	64-bit DDR	3.2	0.5	1.0	2.1	No		21	No	1x DVI	GeForce PCX 5300	Shader Model 2.0
Quadro FX 350	2006-04-20	G72GL (Curie)	550	405 (810)	128	64-bit DDR2	6.48	1.1	2.2	2.1	No		21	No	DVI, VGA	GeForce 7300LE	
Quadro FX 540	2004-08-09	NV43GL	300	250 (500)	128	128-bit GDDR	8.8	2.4	2.4	2.1	No		35	No	DVI, VGA, S-Video	GeForce 6600LE	
Quadro FX 550	2006-04-20	NV43GL	360	400 (800)	128	128-bit GDDR3	12.8	2.88	2.88	2.1	No		25	No	2× dual-link DVI (max. only 2048×1536), S-Video		
Quadro FX 560	2006-04-20	G73GL	350	600 (1200)	128	128-bit GDDR3	19.2	2.80	4.2	2.1	No		30	No	2× DL-DVI, S-Video	GeForce 7600	
Quadro FX 1300	2004-08-09	NV38GL	350	275 (550)	128	256-bit DDR	17.6	2.80	2.80	2.1	No		55	Yes	2× Single-Link DVI, S-Video	GeForce PCX 5950	
Quadro FX 1400	2004-08-09	NV41GL	350	300 (600)	128	256-bit DDR	19.2	2.80	4.20	2.1	No		70	Yes	2× SL-DVI, VESA Stereo	GeForce 6800	
Quadro FX 1500	2006-04-20	G71GL	325	625 (1250)	256	256-bit GDDR3	40.0	5.20	6.50	2.1	No		65	No	2× DL-DVI, S-Video	GeForce 79xx (16 pixel, 6 vertex)	
Quadro FX 3400	2004-06-28	NV40 A1 (NV45GL)	350	450 (900)	256	256-bit GDDR3	28.8	4.60	4.60	2.1	No		101	Yes	2× DL-DVI, S-Video	GeForce 6800	
Quadro FX 3450	2005-06-28	NV42GL (Curie)	425	500 (1000)	256	256-bit GDDR3	32.0	5.10	5.10	2.1	No		83	Yes	2× DL-DVI, S-Video	GeForce 6800	
Quadro FX 3500	2006-05-22	G71GL	450	660 (1320)	256	256-bit GDDR3	42.2	7.20	9.00	2.1	No		80	Yes	2× DVI, S-Video	GeForce 7900GS	reduced Quadro FX 5500
Quadro FX 4000	2004-04-01	NV42GL	425	500 (1000)	256	256-bit GDDR3	32.0	5.10	5.10	2.1	No		142	Yes	2× DVI, S-Video		
Quadro FX 4000 SDI	2004-04-19	NV42GL	425	500 (1000)	256	256-bit GDDR3	32.0	5.10	5.10	2.1	No		150	Yes	DVI, 2× SDI HDTV		2× SDI HDTV outputs + digital and analog genlock (using external controllers)
Quadro FX 4400	2005-06-28	NV40 A1 (NV45GL)	375	525 (1050)	512	256-bit GDDR3	33.6	5.50	5.50	2.1	No		83	Yes	2× DL-DVI, S-Video	GeForce 6800 PCI-E	Variant FX 4400G with Genlock
Quadro FX 4500	2005-06-28	G70GL	470	525 (1050)	512	256-bit GDDR3	33.6	6.88	10.3	2.1	No		109	Yes	2× DL-DVI, S-Video	GeForce 7800GTX	
Quadro FX 4500 SDI	2006-02-11	G70GL	470	525 (1050)	512	256-bit GDDR3	33.6	6.88	10.3	2.1	No		116	Yes	DL-DVI, 2× HDTV	GeForce 7800GTX	analog and digital genlock
Quadro FX 4500 X2	2006-04-24	G70GL (2×)	500	600 (1200)	2× 512	2× 256-bit GDDR3	2×33.6	2× 8.0	2× 12.0	2.1	No		145	Yes	4x DL-DVI	Quadro FX 4500	Two GPU units on the same card
Quadro FX 5500	2006-04-20	G71GL	650	500 (1000)	1024	256-bit GDDR3	32.3	10.4	15.6	2.1	No		96	Yes	2× DL-DVI, S-Video	GeForce 7900GTX	
Quadro FX 5500 SDI	2006-04-20	G71GL	650	500 (1000)	1024	256-bit GDDR3	32.3	10.4	15.6	2.1	No		104	Yes		Quadro FX 5500	with SDI, genlock/frame lock support (via external hardware)

=== Quadro FX (with CUDA and OpenCL, but no Vulkan) ===
- Architecture Tesla (G80+, GT2xx) with OpenGL 3.3 and OpenCL 1.1
- Tesla (G80+): DirectX 10, Shader Model 4.0, only Single Precision (FP32) available for CUDA and OpenCL
- Tesla 2 (GT2xx): DirectX 10.1, Shader Model 4.1, Single Precision (FP32) available for CUDA and OpenCL (Double Precision (FP64) available for CUDA and OpenCL only for GT200 with CUDA Compute Capability 1.3 )

Quadro_FX PCIe Model	Launch	Core	Core clock	Memory clock (eff.)	Memory size (MB)	Memory type	Memory bandwidth	CUDA cores	CUDA Compute Capability	Open GL	Open CL	Vulkan	Power max.	3-pin stereo connector	Monitor Output	Near GeForce Model	Notes
Units			MHz	MHz	MB		GiB/s						Watt				
Quadro FX 370	2007-09-12	G84 (Tesla)	360 (720 Shader clock)	500 (1000)	256	64-bit GDDR2	6.4	16	1.1	3.3	1.1	No	35	No	1× Dual-link DVI-I, 1× single-link DVI		Shader Model 4.0 DirectX 10
Quadro FX 370 LP	2008-06-11	G86	540 (1300 Shader clock)	500 (1000)	256	64-bit GDDR2	8	8	1.1	3.3	1.1	No	25	No	DMS-59		Low Profile
Quadro FX 380	2009-03-30	G96	450 (1100 Shader clock)	350 (700)	256	128-bit GDDR3	22.4	16	1.1	3.3	1.1	No	34	No	2× Dual-link DVI-I	GeForce 9400	
Quadro FX 380 LP	2009-12-01	GT218GL	550 (1375 Shader clock)	400 (800)	512	64-bit GDDR3	12.8	16	1.2	3.3	1.1	No	28	No	1× Dual-link DVI-I, 1× DisplayPort		Low Profile
Quadro FX 570	2007-09-12	G84GL	460 (920 Shader clock)	400 (800)	256	128-bit GDDR2	12.8	16	1.1	3.3	1.1	No	38	No	2× Dual-link DVI-I		Shader Model 4.0, DirectX 10
Quadro FX 580	2009-04-09	G96	450 (1125 Shader clock)	800 (1600)	512	128-bit GDDR3	25.6	32	1.1	3.3	1.1	No	40	No	1× Dual-link DVI-I, 2× DP (10-bits per color)	GeForce 9500	
Quadro FX 1700	2007-12-09	G84-875-A2	460 (920 Shader clock)	400 (800)	512	128-bit GDDR2	12.8	32	1.1	3.3	1.1	No	42	No	2× DL-DVI, S-Video (TV-Out)	GeForce 8600GT	Shader Model 4.0, DirectX 10.
Quadro FX 1800	2009-03-30	G94	550 (1375 Shader clock)	800 (1600)	768	192-bit GDDR3	38.4	64	1.1	3.3	1.1	No	59	No	1× Dual-link DVI-I, 2× DP (10-bits per color)	GeForce 9600GT	Shader Model 4.0, DirectX 10.
Quadro FX 3700	2008-01-08	G92-875-A2	500 (1250 Shader clock)	800 (1600)	512	256-bit GDDR3	51.2	112	1.1	3.3	1.1	No	78	Yes	2× DVI, S-Video	GeForce 8800GT	PCI Express 2.0, Energy Star 4.0 compliant (<= 80W)
Quadro FX 3800	2009-03-30	G200-835-B3 + NVIO2-A2	600 (1204 Shader clock)	800 (1600)	1024	256-bit GDDR3	51.2	192	1.3	3.3	1.1	No	107	Yes	DVI, 2× DisplayPort (10bits per Color)	GeForce GTX 260	Stereo requires an optional 3 pin S Bracket
Quadro FX 3800 SDI	2009-03-30	GT200GL	600 (1204 Shader clock)	800 (1600)	1024	256-bit GDDR3	51.2	192	1.3	3.3	1.1	No	107	Yes	DVI, 2× DisplayPort	Quadro FX 3800	HD-SDI Ports
Quadro FX 4600	2007-03-05	G80GL	500 (1200 Shader clock)	700 (1400)	768	384-bit GDDR3	67.2	112	1.0	3.3	1.1	No	134	Yes	2× DL-DVI, S-Video	GeForce 8800GTS (G80)	One 6-pin power connector
Quadro FX 4600 SDI	2007-05-30	G80GL	500 (1200 Shader clock)	700 (1400)	768	384-bit GDDR3	67.2	112	1.0	3.3	1.1	No	154	Yes		Quadro FX 4600	with SDI, genlock/frame lock support (via external hardware), One 6-pin power connector
Quadro FX 4700 X2	2006-04-24	G92	600 (1350 Shader clock)	800 (1600)	2× 1024	2× 256-bit GDDR3	2× 51.2	2× 128	1.1	3.3	1.1	No	226	Yes	2× DL-DVI, S-Video	GeForce 9800GX2	Two GPU units on the same card
Quadro FX 5600	2007-03-05	G80-875-A2 + NVIO-1-A3	600 (1350 Shader clock)	800 (1600)	1536	384-bit GDDR3	76.8	128	1.0	3.3	1.1 (1.0 OS X)	No	171	Yes	2× DVI, S-Video	GeForce 8800GTX	Two 6-pin power connectors
Quadro FX 5600 SDI	2007-03-05	G80GL	600 (1350 Shader clock)	800 (1600)	1536	384-bit GDDR3	76.8	128	1.0	3.3	1.1 (1.0 OS X)	No	171	Yes	2× DVI, S-Video	Quadro FX 5600	Two 6-pin power connectors, HD-SDI Version
Quadro FX 4800	2008-11-11	G200-850-B3 + NVIO2-A2	602 (1204 Shader clock)	800 (1600)	1536	384-bit GDDR3	77	192	1.3	3.3	1.1 (1.0 Mac OS X)	No	150	Yes	DVI, 2× DP, S-Video	55 nm version of GeForce GTX 260	Quadro CX without Elemental Technologies' CS4 plug-in., SDI Version available
Quadro FX 4800 SDI	2008-11-11	D10U-20 (GT200GL)	602 (1204 Shader clock)	800 (1600)	1536	384-bit GDDR3	77	192	1.3	3.3	1.1 (1.0 Mac OS X)	No	150	Yes	DVI, 2× DP, S-Video, SDI	FX 4800	HD-SDI
Quadro FX 5800	2008-11-11	G200-875-B2 + NVIO2-A2	610 (1296 Shader clock)	800 (1600)	4096	512-bit GDDR3	102	240	1.3	3.3	1.1	No	189	Yes	DVI, 2× DP, S-Video	GeForce GTX 285	SDI Version available
Quadro FX 5800 SDI	2008-11-11	D10U-30 (GT200GL)	610 (1296 Shader clock)	800 (1600)	4096	512-bit GDDR3	102	240	1.3	3.3	1.1	No	189	Yes	DVI, 2× DP, S-Video	GeForce GTX 285	HD-SDI
Quadro CX	2008-11-11	D10U-20 (GT200GL)	602 (1204 Shader clock)	800 (1600)	1536	384-bit GDDR3	76.8	192	1.3	3.3	1.1	No	150	Yes	1× DP, 1× DL-DVI, S-Video	55 nm GeForce GTX 260	optimised for Adobe Creative Suite 4, HD-SDI optional
Quadro VX 200	2008-01-08	G92-851-A2	450 (1125 Shader clock)	800 (1600)	512	GDDR3	51.2	96	1.1	3.3	1.1	No	78	No	HDTV and 2× Dual-link DVI	GeForce 8800GT	optimised for Autodesk AutoCAD.

=== Quadro ===
- Architecture Fermi (GFxxx), Kepler (GKxxx), Maxwell (GMxxx), Pascal (GPxxx), Volta (GVxxx) (except Quadro 400 with Tesla 2)
- All Cards with Display Port 1.1+ can support 10bit per Channel for OpenGL (HDR for Graphics Professional (Adobe Photoshop and more))
- Vulkan 1.2 available with Driver Windows 456.38, Linux 455.23.04 for Kepler, Maxwell, Pascal, Volta
- All Kepler, Maxwell, Pascal, Volta and later can do OpenGL 4.6 with Driver 418+
- All Quadro can do OpenCL 1.1. Kepler can do OpenCL 1.2, Maxwell and later can do OpenCL 3.0
- All can do Double Precision with Compute Capability 2.0 and higher (see CUDA)

Quadro GPU	Launch	Core	Core clock	Memory clock	Memory size (MB)	Memory type	Memory bandwidth	CUDA cores	CUDA Compute Capability	DirectX	Open GL	Open CL	Vulkan	Power max.	3-pin stereo connector	MonitorOutput	Near GeForce Model	Notes
Units			MHz	MHz	MB		GiB/s							Watt				
Quadro 400	2011-04-05	GT216GL (40 nm)	450 (1125 Shader clock)	800	512	64-bit GDDR3	12.3	48	1.2	10.1	3.3	1.1	No	32	No	1× Dual-link DVI-I, 1× DP 1.1a, HDMI 1.3a (via adapter)	GeForce GT 220	GeForce 200 series Tesla-2-based
Quadro 600	2010-12-13	GF108GL	640	800	1024	128-bit GDDR3	25.6	96	2.1	11.0 (11_0)	4.6	1.1	No	40	No	1×DL-DVI-I, 1× DisplayPort 1.1a, HDMI 1.3a (via adapter).	GeForce GT 430	Based on the GeForce 400 series Fermi-based
Quadro 2000	2010-12-24	GF106GL	625	1300	1024	128-bit GDDR5	41.6	192	2.1	11.0 (11_0)	4.6	1.1	No	62	No	1× DL-DVI-I, 2× DP 1.1a, HDMI 1.3a (via adapter)	GeForce GTS 450	Fermi-based
Quadro 2000D	2011-10-05	GF106GL	625	1300	1024	128-bit GDDR5	41.6	192	2.1	11.0 (11_0)	4.6	1.1	No	62	No	2× DL-DVI-I	GeForce GTS 450	10 and 12 bit per each rgb Channel (10-bits internal)
Quadro 4000 (SDI)	2010-11-02	GF100GL	475	700	2048	256-bit GDDR5	89.6	256	2.0	11.0 (11_0)	4.6	1.1	No	142	Yes	1× DL-DVI-I, 2× DP 1.1a, HDMI 1.3a (via adapter)	?	HD-SDI optional
Quadro 5000 (SDI)	2011-02-23	GF100GL (Fermi)	513	750	2560	320-bit GDDR5 ECC	120	352	2.0	11.0 (11_0)	4.6	1.1	No	152	Yes	1× DL-DVI-I, 2× DP 1.1a, HDMI 1.3a (via adapter)	GeForce GTX 465/470 (cutdown)	GeForce 400 series, HD-SDI optional
Quadro 6000 (SDI)	2010-12-10	GF100GL (Fermi)	574	750	6144	384-bit GDDR5 ECC	144	448	2.0	11.0 (11_0)	4.6	1.1	No	204	Yes	1×DL-DVI-I, 2× DP 1.1a, HDMI 1.3a (via adapter)	GeForce GTX 480 (cutdown)	GeForce 400 series, HD-SDI optional
Quadro 7000	2012-05-12	GF110GL	650	925	6144	384-bit GDDR5 ECC	177.4	512	2.0	11.0 (11_0)	4.6	1.1	No	204	Yes	2× DP 1.1a, DVI, S-Video	GeForce GTX 580	Fermi-based
Quadro Plex 7000	2011-07-25	2× GF100GL	574	750	2× 6144	2× 384-bit GDDR5 ECC	2× 144	2× 512	2.0	11.0 (11_0)	4.6	1.1	No	600	Yes	4x DP 1.1a, 2× S-Video	GeForce GTX 590	Based on two Quadro 6000.
Quadro 410	2012-08-07	GK107GLM (28 nm)	706	891	512	64-bit DDR3	14	192	3.0	12.0 (11_0)	4.6	1.2	1.2	38	No	1× Single-link DVI-I, 1× DP 1.2, HDMI 1.4 (via adapter)	GeForce GT 630 (Kepler)	GeForce 600 series Kepler-based
Quadro K420	2014-07-14	GK107GL	780	900	1024	128-bit GDDR3	29	192	3.0	12.0 (11_0)	4.6	1.2	1.2	41	No	1× DL-DVI, 1× DP 1.2	GeForce GT 630 (Kepler)	Kepler-based
Quadro K600	2013-03-01	GK107GL	875	900	1024	128-bit GDDR3	29	192	3.0	12.0 (11_0)	4.6	1.2	1.2	41	No	1× DL-DVI-I, 1× DP 1.2	GeForce GT 630 (Kepler)	Kepler-based
Quadro K620	2014-07-14	GM107GL	1000	900	2048	128-bit GDDR3	29	384	5.0	12.0 (11_0)	4.6	1.2	1.2	45	No	1× DL-DVI, 1× DP 1.2,	GeForce GTX 745 (OEM)	Maxwell-based
Quadro K1200	2015-01-28	GM107GL	1000	1250	4096	128-bit GDDR5	80	512	5.0	12.0 (11_0)	4.6	1.2	1.2	45	No	4x Mini-DP 1.2	GeForce GTX 750	Maxwell-based
Quadro K2000	2013-03-01	GK107GL	954	1000	2048	128-bit GDDR5	64	384	3.0	12.0 (11_0)	4.6	1.2	1.2	51	No	1× DL-DVI-I, 2× DP 1.2	GeForce GTX 650	Kepler-based
Quadro K2000D	2013-03-01	GK107GL	950	1000	2048	128-bit GDDR5	64	384	3.0	12.0 (11_0)	4.6	1.2	1.2	51	No	2× DL-DVI-I, 1× DP 1.2	GeForce GTX 650	Kepler-based
Quadro K2200	2014-07-22	GM107GL	1046	1250	4096	128-bit GDDR5	80	640	5.0	12.0 (11_0)	4.6	1.2	1.2	68	No	1× DL-DVI-I, 2× DP 1.2	GeForce GTX 750 Ti	Maxwell-based
Quadro K4000	2013-03-01	GK106GL	800	1400	3072	192-bit GDDR5	134	768	3.0	12.0 (11_0)	4.6	1.2	1.2	80	Yes	1× DL-DVI-I, 2× DP1.2	GeForce GTX 650 Ti Boost	Kepler-based, HD-SDI optional with extra Card
Quadro K4200	2014-07-22	GK104-850-A2	780	1350	4096	256-bit GDDR5	173	1344	3.0	12.0 (11_0)	4.6	1.2	1.2	108	Yes	1× DL-DVI-I, 2× DP 1.2	GeForce GTX 670	Kepler-based, HD-SDI optional
Quadro K5000	2012-08-17	GK104GL	706	1350	4096	256-bit GDDR5 ECC	173	1536	3.0	12.0 (11_0)	4.6	1.2	1.2	122	Yes	2x DP 1.2	GeForce GTX 770/680	Kepler-based, HD-SDI optional
Quadro K5200	2014-07-22	GK110-850-B1	650	1500	8192	256-bit GDDR5 ECC	192	2304	3.5	12.0 (11_0)	4.6	1.2	1.2	150	Yes	1× DL-DVI-I, 1× DL-DVI-D, 2× DP 1.2	GeForce GTX 780	Kepler-based, HD-SDI optional
Quadro K6000	2013-07-23	GK110-890-B1	700	1500	12288	384-bit GDDR5 ECC	288	2880	3.5	12.0 (11_0)	4.6	1.2	1.2	225	Yes	2× DP 1.2	GeForce GTX TITAN Black	Kepler-based, HD-SDI optional
Quadro M2000	2016-04-08	GM206-875	796–1163	1653	4096	128-bit GDDR5	105.8	768	5.2	12.0 (12_1)	4.6	3.0	1.3	75	No	4x DP 1.2	GeForce GTX 950	Maxwell-based
Quadro M4000	2015-06-29	GM204-850	773	1502	8192	256-bit GDDR5	192.3	1664	5.2	12.0 (12_1)	4.6	3.0	1.3	120	Yes	4x DP 1.2	GeForce GTX 970	Maxwell-based
Quadro M5000	2015-06-29	GM204-875	861–1038	1653	8192	256-bit GDDR5 ECC	211.6	2048	5.2	12.0 (12_1)	4.6	3.0	1.3	150	Yes	4x DP 1.2	GeForce GTX 980	Maxwell-based
Quadro M6000	2015-03-15	GM200-876-A1	988–1114	1653	12288	384-bit GDDR5 ECC	317.4	3072	5.2	12.0 (12_1)	4.6	3.0	1.3	250	Yes	4x DP 1.2	GeForce GTX TITAN X	Maxwell-based
Quadro M6000 24 GB	2016-03-05	GM200-880	988–1114	1653	24576	384-bit GDDR5 ECC	317.4	3072	5.2	12.0 (12_1)	4.6	3.0	1.3	250	Yes	4x DP 1.2	GeForce GTX TITAN X	Maxwell-based
Quadro P400	2017-02-06	GP107-825	1228–1252	1003	2048	64-bit GDDR5	32.1	256	6.1	12.0 (12_1)	4.6	3.0	1.3	30	No	3x mini-DP 1.4	GeForce GT 1030	Pascal-based
Quadro P600	2017-02-06	GP107-850	1329–1557	1003	2048	128-bit GDDR5	64.2	384	6.1	12.0 (12_1)	4.6	3.0	1.3	40	No	4x mini-DP 1.4	GeForce GT 1030	Pascal-based
Quadro P620	2018-02-01	GP107-855	1266–1354	1252	2048	128-bit GDDR5	80.13	512	6.1	12.0 (12_1)	4.6	3.0	1.3	40	No	4x mini-DP 1.4	GeForce GTX 1050	Pascal-based
Quadro P1000	2017-02-06	GP107-860	1266–1481	1253	4096	128-bit GDDR5	80.19	640	6.1	12.0 (12_1)	4.6	3.0	1.3	47	No	4x mini-DP 1.4	GeForce GTX 1050	Pascal-based
Quadro P2000	2017-02-06	GP106-875-K1	1076–1480	1752	5120	160-bit GDDR5	140.2	1024	6.1	12.0 (12_1)	4.6	3.0	1.3	75	No	4x DP 1.4	GeForce GTX 1060	Pascal-based
Quadro P2200	2019-06-10	GP106-880-K1	1000–1493	1253	5120	160-bit GDDR5X	200.5	1280	6.1	12.0 (12_1)	4.6	3.0	1.3	75	No	4x DP 1.4	GeForce GTX 1060	Pascal-based
Quadro P4000	2017-02-06	GP104-850	1202–1480	1901	8192	256-bit GDDR5	243.3	1792	6.1	12.0 (12_1)	4.6	3.0	1.3	105	Yes	DVI, 4x DP 1.4	GeForce GTX 1070	Pascal-based
Quadro P5000	2016-10-01	GP104-875	1607–1733	1127	16384	256-bit GDDR5X	288.5	2560	6.1	12.0 (12_1)	4.6	3.0	1.3	180	Yes	DVI, 4x DP 1.4	GeForce GTX 1080	Pascal-based
Quadro P6000	2016-10-01	GP102-875	1506–1645	1127	24576	384-bit GDDR5X	432.8	3840	6.1	12.0 (12_1)	4.6	3.0	1.3	250	Yes	DVI, 4x DP 1.4	Nvidia TITAN Xp	Pascal-based
Quadro GP100	2017-02-06	GP100-876	1304–1442	715	16384	4096-bit HBM2	732.2	3584	6.0	12.0 (12_1)	4.6	3.0	1.3	235	Yes	Dual-Link DVI, 4x DP 1.4	Nvidia TITAN Xp	Pascal-based
Quadro GV100	2018-03-27	GV100-875	1132–1627	848	32768	4096-bit HBM2	868.4	5120	7.0	12.0 (12_1)	4.6	3.0	1.3	250	Yes	4x DP 1.4	Nvidia TITAN V	Volta-based

^{1} Nvidia Quadro 342.01 WHQL: support of OpenGL 3.3 and OpenCL 1.1 for legacy Tesla microarchitecture Quadros.

^{2} Nvidia Quadro 377.83 WHQL: support of OpenGL 4.5, OpenCL 1.1 for legacy Fermi microarchitecture Quadros.

^{3} Nvidia Quadro 474.72 WHQL: support of OpenGL 4.6, OpenCL 1.2, Vulkan 1.2 for legacy Kepler microarchitecture Quadros.

^{4} Nvidia Quadro 552.22 WHQL: support of OpenGL 4.6, OpenCL 3.0, Vulkan 1.3 for Maxwell, Pascal & Volta microarchitecture Quadros.

^{5} OpenCL 1.1 is available for Tesla-Chips, OpenCL 1.0 for some Cards with G8x, G9x and GT200 by MAC OS X

=== Quadro RTX/T/RTX ===
- Turing (TU10x) microarchitecture
- Ampere (GA10x) microarchitecture
- Ada Lovelace (AD10x) microarchitecture
- Quadro naming dropped beginning with Ampere-based GPUs and later Turing-based GPUs (T400, T600, T1000)
- Quadro RTX/RTX series GPUs have tensor cores and hardware support for real-time ray tracing

Quadro GPU	Launch	Core	Core clock	Memory clock	Memory size (GB)	Memory type	Memory bandwidth	CUDA cores	Tensor cores	RT cores	Half precision	Single precision	Double precision	CUDA Compute Capability	DirectX	OpenGL	OpenCL	Vulkan	Power max.	3-pin stereo connector	Display Output	Near GeForce Model	Notes
Units			MHz	MHz	GB		GiB/s				TFLOPS	TFLOPS	GFLOPS						Watt				
T400	2021-05-06	TU117-8??-A1	420–1425	1250	2/4	64-bit GDDR6	80	384	N/A	N/A	2.189	1.094	34.20	7.5	12.0 (12_1)	4.6	3.0	1.3	30	No	3x mDP 1.4	GeForce GTX 1630 (Cut-down)	Turing-based
T600	2021-04-12	TU117-8??-A1	735–1395	1250	4	128-bit GDDR6	160	640	N/A	N/A	3.418	1.709	53.40	7.5	12.0 (12_1)	4.6	3.0	1.3	40	No	4x mDP 1.4	GeForce GTX 1650 (Cut-down)	Turing-based
T1000	2021-05-06	TU117-8??-A1	1065–1395	1250	4/8	128-bit GDDR6	160	896	N/A	N/A	5	2.5	78.12	7.5	12.0 (12_1)	4.6	3.0	1.3	50	No	4x mDP 1.4	GeForce GTX 1650	Turing-based
Quadro RTX 4000	2018-11-13	TU104-850	1005–1545	1625	8	256-bit GDDR6	416	2304	288	36	14.2	7.1	221.8	7.5	12.0 (12_2)	4.6	3.0	1.3	160	Yes	3x DP 1.4, Virtual Link	GeForce RTX 2070	Turing-based
Quadro RTX 5000	2018-11-13	TU104-875	1620–1815	1750	16 (32 with NVLink)	256-bit GDDR6	448	3072	384	48	22.3	11.2	350	7.5	12.0 (12_2)	4.6	3.0	1.3	265	Yes	4x DP 1.4, Virtual Link	GeForce RTX 2080 Super	Turing-based
Quadro RTX 6000	2018-11-13	TU102-875	1440–1770	1750	24 (48 with NVLink)	384-bit GDDR6	672	4608	576	72	32.6	16.3	509.8	7.5	12.0 (12_2)	4.6	3.0	1.3	295	Yes	4x DP 1.4, Virtual Link	Nvidia TITAN RTX	Turing-based
Quadro RTX 8000	2018-11-13	TU102-875	1395–1770	1750	48 (96 with NVLink)	384-bit GDDR6	672	4608	576	72	32.6	16.3	509.8	7.5	12.0 (12_2)	4.6	3.0	1.3	295	Yes	4x DP 1.4, Virtual Link	Nvidia TITAN RTX	Turing-based
RTX A400	2024-04-16	GA107-???	727–1762	1500	4	64-bit GDDR6	96	768	24	6	2.706	2.706	42.29	8.6	12.0 (12_2)	4.6	3.0	1.3	50		4x mDP 1.4	GeForce RTX 3050 (Cut-down)	Ampere-based
RTX A1000	2024-04-16	GA107-???	727–1462	1500	8	128-bit GDDR6	192	2304	72	18	6.737	6.737	105.3	8.6	12.0 (12_2)	4.6	3.0	1.3	50		4x mDP 1.4	GeForce RTX 3050 (Cut-down)	Ampere-based
RTX A2000	2021-08-10	GA106-850	562–1200	1500	6	192-bit GDDR6	288	3328	104	26	7.987	7.987	249.615	8.6	12.0 (12_2)	4.6	3.0	1.3	70	No	4x mDP 1.4	GeForce RTX 3060	Ampere-based
RTX A2000	2021-11-23	GA106-850	562–1200	1500	12	192-bit GDDR6	288	3328	104	26	7.987	7.987	249.615	8.6	12.0 (12_2)	4.6	3.0	1.3	70		4x mDP 1.4	GeForce RTX 3060	Ampere-based
RTX A4000	2021-04-12	GA104-875	735–1560	1750	16	256-bit GDDR6	448	6144	192	48	19.170	19.170	599.078	8.6	12.0 (12_2)	4.6	3.0	1.3	140	Yes	4x DP 1.4	GeForce RTX 3070 Ti	Ampere-based
RTX A4500	2021-11-23	GA102-825	1050–1650	2000	20 (40 with NVLink 3.0)	320-bit GDDR6	640	7168	224	56	23.656	23.656	739.247	8.6	12.0 (12_2)	4.6	3.0	1.3	200	Yes	4x DP 1.4	GeForce RTX 3080	Ampere-based
RTX A5000	2021-04-12	GA102-850	1170–1695	2000	24 (48 with NVLink 3.0)	384-bit GDDR6	768	8192	256	64	27.772	27.772	867.895	8.6	12.0 (12_2)	4.6	3.0	1.3	230	Yes	4x DP 1.4	GeForce RTX 3080	Ampere-based
RTX A5500	2022-03-22	GA102-860	1080–1665	2000	24 (48 with NVLink 3.0)	384-bit GDDR6	768	10240	320	80	34.101	34.101	1065.667	8.6	12.0 (12_2)	4.6	3.0	1.3	230	Yes	4x DP 1.4	GeForce RTX 3080 Ti	Ampere-based
RTX A6000	2020-10-05	GA102-875	1410–1800	2000	48 (96 with NVLink 3.0)	384-bit GDDR6	768	10752	336	84	38.709	38.709	1209.677	8.6	12.0 (12_2)	4.6	3.0	1.3	300	Yes	4x DP 1.4	GeForce RTX 3090	Ampere-based
RTX 2000 Ada Generation	2024-02-12	AD107-???	1620–2130	2000	16	128-bit GDDR6	224	2816	88	22	12	12	187.4	8.9	12.0 (12_2)	4.6	3.0	1.3	70		4x mDP 1.4a	GeForce RTX 4060 (Cut-down)	Ada Lovelace-based
RTX 4000 SFF Ada Generation	2023-03-21	AD104-???	1290–1565	1750	20	160-bit GDDR6	280	6144	192	48	19.17	19.17	299.5	8.9	12.0 (12_2)	4.6	3.0	1.3	70		4x mDP 1.4a	GeForce RTX 4070 (Cut-down)	Ada Lovelace-based
RTX 4000 Ada Generation	2023-08-09	AD104-???	1500– 2175	2250	20	160-bit GDDR6	360	6144	192	48	26.73	26.73	417.6	8.9	12.0 (12_2)	4.6	3.0	1.3	130		4x DP 1.4a	GeForce RTX 4070	Ada Lovelace-based
RTX 4500 Ada Generation	2023-08-09	AD104-???	2070– 2580	2250	24	192-bit GDDR6	432	7680	240	60	39.63	39.63	619.2	8.9	12.0 (12_2)	4.6	3.0	1.3	210		4x DP 1.4a	GeForce RTX 4070 Ti	Ada Lovelace-based
RTX 5000 Ada Generation	2023-08-09	AD102-850-KAB-A1	1155– 2550	2250	32	256-bit GDDR6	576	12800	400	100	65.28	65.28	1020	8.9	12.0 (12_2)	4.6	3.0	1.3	250		4x DP 1.4a	GeForce RTX 4080	Ada Lovelace-based
RTX 5880 Ada Generation	2024-01-05	AD102-???	975–2460	2250	48	384-bit GDDR6	960	14080	440	110	69.27	69.27	1082	8.9	12.0 (12_2)	4.6	3.0	1.3	285		4x DP 1.4a	GeForce RTX 4090D	Ada Lovelace-based
RTX 6000 Ada Generation	2022-12-03	AD102-870	915–2505	2500	48	384-bit GDDR6	960	18176	568	142	91.06	91.06	1423	8.9	12.0 (12_2)	4.6	3.0	1.3	300	Yes	4x DP 1.4a	GeForce RTX 4090	Ada Lovelace-based

== For business NVS ==
The Nvidia Quadro NVS graphics processing units (GPUs) provide business graphics solutions for manufacturers of small, medium, and enterprise-level business workstations. The Nvidia Quadro NVS desktop solutions enable multi-display graphics for businesses such as financial traders.

- Architecture Celsius (NV1x): DirectX 7, OpenGL 1.2 (1.3)
- Architecture Kelvin (NV2x): DirectX 8 (8.1), OpenGL 1.3 (1.5), Pixel Shader 1.1 (1.3)
- Architecture Rankine (NV3x): DirectX 9.0a, OpenGL 1.5 (2.1), Shader Model 2.0a
- Architecture Curie (NV4x): DirectX 9.0c, OpenGL 2.1, Shader Model 3.0
- Architecture Tesla (G80+): DirectX 10.0, OpenGL 3.3, Shader Model 4.0, CUDA 1.0 or 1.1, OpenCL 1.1
- Architecture Tesla 2 (GT2xx): DirectX 10.1, OpenGL 3.3, Shader Model 4.1, CUDA 1.2 or 1.3, OpenCL 1.1
- Architecture Fermi (GFxxx): DirectX 11.0, OpenGL 4.6, Shader Model 5.0, CUDA 2.x, OpenCL 1.1
- Architecture Kepler (GKxxx): DirectX 11.2, OpenGL 4.6, Shader Model 5.0, CUDA 3.x, OpenCL 1.2, Vulkan 1.2
- Architecture Maxwell 1 (GM1xx): DirectX 12.0, OpenGL 4.6, Shader Model 5.0, CUDA 5.0, OpenCL 3.0, Vulkan 1.3

Quadro NVS model	Launch	Max. resolution (digital)	Interface	Display connectors	Displays supported	Power consumption	Core	Notes
Units						Watt		
Quadro NVS 50	2005-05-31	1600×1200	AGP 8× / PCI	DVI-I, S-Video	1	10	NV18 (Celsius)	OpenGL 1.3, DirectX 8.0
Quadro4 NVS 100	2003-12-22	2048×1536	AGP 4× / PCI	1x DVI-I, VGA, S-Video	2	10	NV17(A3)	
Quadro NVS 200	2003-12-22	1280×1024	AGP 4× / PCI	LFH-60	2	11	NV17	
Quadro NVS 210s	2003-12-22	1720×1200	Onboard (nForce 430)	DVI + VGA	?	11	MCP51	no PureVideoHD, only SD
Quadro NVS 280 (PCI)	2003-10-28	1600×1200	PCI	DMS-59	2	12	NV34 A1	
Quadro NVS 280 (AGP, PCIe)	2004-05-25	1600×1200	PCI-E ×16 / AGP 8×	DMS-59	2	12	NV34 A1	
Quadro NVS 285	2006-06-06	1920×1200	PCI-Express ×1/×16	DMS-59	2	13/18	NV44	
Quadro NVS 290	2007-10-04	1920×1200	PCI-Express ×1/×16	DMS-59	2	21	G86	Tesla based
Quadro NVS 295	2009-05-07	2560×1600	PCI-Express ×1/×16	2× DisplayPort or 2× DVI-D	2	23	G98	Tesla based
Quadro NVS 400	2004-07-16	1280×1024	PCI	2× DMS-59	4	18	2× NV17 A3	
Quadro NVS 420	2009-01-20	2560×1600	PCI-Express ×1/×16	VHDCI (4× DisplayPort or 4× DVI-D)	4	40	2× G98	
Quadro NVS 440	2009-03-09	1920×1200	PCI-Express ×1/×16	2× DMS-59	4	31	2× NV43	
Quadro NVS 450	2008-11-11	2560×1600	PCI-Express ×16	4× DisplayPort	4	35	2× G98	
NVS 300	2011-01-08	2560×1600	PCI-Express ×1/×16	DMS-59	2	17.5	GT218	Tesla 2 based
NVS 310	2012-06-26	2560×1600	PCI-Express ×16	2× DisplayPort	2	19.5	GF119	Fermi based (GeForce 510)
NVS 315	2013-03-10	2560×1600	PCI-Express ×16	DMS-59	2	19.5	GF119	
NVS 510	2012-10-23	3840×2160	PCI-Express 2.0 ×16	4× Mini-DisplayPort	4	35	GK107	Kepler-based
NVS 810	2015-11-04	4096×2160 (8@30 Hz, 4@60 Hz)	PCI-Express 3.0 ×16	8× Mini-DisplayPort	8	68	2× GM107	Maxwell based

== Mobile applications ==
=== Quadro FX M (without Vulkan) ===
- Architecture Rankine (NV3x), Curie (NV4x, G7x) and Tesla (G80+, GT2xx)

Quadro FX M Model	Launch YYYY-MM-dd	Core	Fab	Bus interface	Core clock	Shader clock	Memory clock	Config core	Fillrate		Memory			Bus width	Processing Power (GFLOPs)		API support					TDP
Quadro FX M Model	Launch YYYY-MM-dd	Core	Fab	Bus interface	Core clock	Shader clock	Memory clock	Config core	Pixel	Texture	Size	Band- with	Type	Bus width	Single precision	Double precision	DirectX	OpenGL	CUDA Compute Capability	OpenCL	Vulkan	TDP
Units			nm		MHz	MHz	MHz		GP/s	GT/s	MB	GB/s		bit								Watt
Quadro FX Go 540	2004-08-09	NV43GL	110	MXM-II	300	300	550	4:8:8:8	2.4	2.4	128	8.8	GDDR3	128		No	9.0c	2.1	No		No	42
Quadro FX Go 700	2003-06-25	NV31GLM	130	AGP 4x	295	295	590	3:4:4:4	1.18	1.18	128	9.44	DDR3	128		No	9.0a	2.1	No		No	unknown
Quadro FX Go 1000	2005-02-25	NV36GLM	130	AGP 4x	295	295	570	3:4:4:4	1.18	1.18	128	9.12	DDR3	128		No	9.0a	2.1	No		No	unknown
Quadro FX Go 1400	2005-02-25	NV41GLM	110	MXM-III	275	275	590	5:8:8:8	2.2	2.2	256	18.88	DDR3	256		No	9.0c	2.1	No		No	unknown
Quadro FX 350M	2006-03-13	G72GLM (Curie)	90	PCI-E 1.0 ×16	450	450	900	3:4:4:2	0.9	1.8	256	14.4	GDDR3	128		No	9.0c	2.1	No		No	15
Quadro FX 360M	2007-05-09	G86GLM (Tesla)	80	PCI-E 1.0 ×16	400	800	1200	16:8:4:2	1.6	3.2	256	9.6	GDDR2	64	25.6	No	10	3.3	1.1	1.1	No	17
Quadro FX 370M	2008-08-15	G98GLM (Tesla)	65	PCI-E 2.0 ×16	550	1400	1200	8:4:4:1	2.2	2.2	256	9.6	GDDR3	64	22.4	No	10	3.3	1.1	1.1	No	20
Quadro FX 380M	2010-01-07	GT218GLM (Tesla 2)	40	PCI-E 2.0 ×16	625	1530	1600	16:8:4:2	2.4	4.8	512	12.6	GDDR3	64	47.0	No, only GT200 1/8 of SP	10.1	3.3	1.2	1.1	No	25
Quadro FX 550M	2006-03-13	G73GLM (Curie)	90	PCI-E 1.0 ×16	480	480	1000	5:12:12:8	4	6	512	19.2	GDDR3	128		No	9.0c	2.1	No		No	35
Quadro FX 560M	2006-03-13	G73GLM (Curie)	90	PCI-E 1.0 ×16	500	500	1200	5:12:12:8	4	6	512	19.2	GDDR3	128		No	9.0c	2.1	No		No	35
Quadro FX 570M	2007-06-01	G84GLM (Tesla)	80	PCI-E 1.0 ×16	475	950	1400	32:16:8:2	3.8	7.6	512	22.4	GDDR3	128	60.8	No	10	3.3	1.1	1.1	No	45
Quadro FX 770M	2008-08-14	G96GLM (Tesla)	65	PCI-E 2.0 ×16	500	1250	1600	32:16:8:2	4	8	512	25.6	GDDR3	128	80	No	10	3.3	1.1	1.1	No	35
Quadro FX 880M	2010-01-07	GT216GLM (Tesla 2)	40	PCI-E 2.0 ×16	550	1210	1600	48:16:8:2	4.4	8.8	1024	25.6	GDDR3	128	116	No, only GT200 1/8 of SP	10.1	3.3	1.2	1.1	No	35
Quadro FX 1500M	2006-04-18	G71GLM	90	PCI-E 1.0 ×16	375	375	1000	8:24:24:16	6	9	512	32	GDDR3	256		No	9.0c	2.1	No		No	45
Quadro FX 1600M	2007-06-01	G84GLM	80	PCI-E 1.0 ×16	625	1250	1600	32:16:8:2	5	10	512	25.6	GDDR3	128	80	No	10	3.3	1.1	1.1	No	50
Quadro FX 1700M	2008-10-01	G96GLM	65	PCI-E 2.0 ×16	625	1550	1600	32:16:8:2	5	10	512	25.6	GDDR3	128	99.2	No	10	3.3	1.1	1.1	No	50
Quadro FX 1800M	2009-06-15	GT215GLM	40	PCI-E 2.0 ×16	450	1080	1600; 2200	72:24:8:3	3.6	10.8	1024	25.6; 35.2	GDDR3; GDDR5	128	162	No, only GT200 1/8 of SP	10.1	3.3	1.2	1.1	No	45
Quadro FX 2500M	2005-09-29	G71GLM	90	PCI-E 1.0 ×16	500	500	1200	8:24:24:16	8	12	512	38.4	GDDR3	256		No	9.0c	2.1	No		No	45
Quadro FX 2700M	2008-08-14	G94GLM	65	PCI-E 2.0 ×16	530	1325	1600	48:24:16:3	8.48	12.72	512	51.2	GDDR3	256	127	No	10	3.3	1.1	1.1	No	65
Quadro FX 2800M	2009-12-01	G92GLM	55	PCI-E 2.0 ×16	500	1250	2000	96:48:16:6	8	16	1024	64	GDDR3	256	288	No	10	3.3	1.1	1.1	No	75
Quadro FX 3500M	2007-03-01	G71GLM	90	PCI-E 1.0 ×16	575	575	1200	8:24:24:16	9.2	13.8	512	38.4	GDDR3	256		No	9.0c	2.1	No		No	45
Quadro FX 3600M	2008-02-23	G92GLM	65	PCI-E 2.0 ×16	500	1250	1600	64:32:16:4; 96:48:16:6	8; 8	16; 24	1024	51.2	GDDR3	256	160; 240	No	10	3.3	1.1	1.1	No	70
Quadro FX 3700M	2008-08-14	G92GLM	65	PCI-E 2.0 ×16	550	1375	1600	128:64:16:8	8.8	35.2	1024	51.2	GDDR3	256	352	No	10	3.3	1.1	1.1	No	75
Quadro FX 3800M	2008-08-14	G92GLM	55	PCI-E 2.0 ×16	675	1688	2000	128:64:16:8	10.8	43.2	1024	64	GDDR3	256	422	No	10	3.3	1.1	1.1	No	100

=== Quadro NVS M ===
- Architecture Curie (NV4x, G7x): DirectX 9.0c, OpenGL 2.1, Shader Model 3.0
- Architecture Tesla (G80+): DirectX 10.0, OpenGL 3.3, Shader Model 4.0, CUDA 1.0 or 1.1, OpenCL 1.1
- Architecture Tesla 2 (GT2xx): DirectX 10.1, OpenGL 3.3, Shader Model 4.1, CUDA 1.2 or 1.3, OpenCL 1.1
- Architecture Fermi (GFxxx): DirectX 11.0, OpenGL 4.6, Shader Model 5.0, CUDA 2.x, OpenCL 1.1
- Architecture Kepler (GKxxx): DirectX 11.2, OpenGL 4.6, Shader Model 5.0, CUDA 3.x, OpenCL 1.2, Vulkan 1.1
- Architecture Maxwell 1 (GM1xx): DirectX 12.0, OpenGL 4.6, Shader Model 5.0, CUDA 5.0, OpenCL 1.2, Vulkan 1.1

Quadro NVS Mobile	Launch	Core	Core clock speed	Memory clock speed	Memory size	Memory type	Memory bandwidth	CUDA cores	Max. power	Interface	3-pin stereo connector	Near GeForce Model	Notes
Units			MHz	MHz	MB		GB/s		Watt				
Quadro NVS 110M	2006-06-01	G72M	300	600	128 / 256 / 512	64-bit DDR	4.80	no	10	PCIe 1.0 ×16	Varies	GeForce Go 7300	Curie-based
Quadro NVS 120M	2006-06-01	G72GLM	450	700	128 / 256 / 512	64-bit DDR2	11.2	no	10	MXM-III	Varies	Quadro FX 350M/GeForce Go 7400	Curie-based
Quadro NVS 130M	2007-05-09	G86M	400	400	128 / 256	64-bit	6.4	16	10	PCIe 2.0 ×16	Varies	GeForce 8400M	Tesla-based
Quadro NVS 135M	2007-05-09	G86M	400	600	128 / 256	64-bit	9.55	16	10	PCIe 2.0 ×16	Varies	GeForce 8400M GS	Tesla-based
Quadro NVS 140M	2007-05-09	G86M	400	700	128 / 256 / 512	64-bit	9.6	16	10	PCIe 2.0 ×16	Varies	GeForce 8500M GT	Tesla-based
Quadro NVS 150M	2008-08-15	G98M	530	700	128 / 256	64-bit	11.22	8	10	MXM-I	Varies	GeForce 9200M GS	Tesla-based
Quadro NVS 160M	2008-08-15	G98M	580	700	256	64-bit	11.22	8	12	MXM-I	Varies	GeForce 9300M GS	Tesla-based
NVS 2100M	2010-01-07	GT218	535	1600	512	64-bit GDDR3	12.8	16	12	PCIe 2.0 ×16	Varies	GeForce 305M	Tesla 2-based
Quadro NVS 300M	2006-05-24	G73GLM	450	500	128 / 256 / 512	128-bit GDDR3	16.16	no	16	PCIe 1.0 ×16	Varies	GeForce Go 7600	Curie-based
Quadro NVS 320M	2007-06-09	G84M	575	700	128 / 256 / 512	128-bit GDDR3	22.55	32	20	MXM-HE	Varies	GeForce 8700M	Tesla-based
NVS 3100M	2010-01-07	GT218	600	1600	512	64-bit GDDR3	12.8	16	14	PCIe 2.0 ×16	Varies	GeForce G210M/310M	Tesla 2-based
NVS 4200M	2011-02-11	GF119	810	1600	1024	64-bit DDR3	12.8	48	25	MXM	Varies	GeForce 410M	Fermi-based
Quadro NVS 510M	2006-08-21	G71GLM	500	600	256 / 512	256-bit GDDR3	38.4	no	35	PCI Express	Varies	GeForce Go 7900 GTX	Curie-based
Quadro NVS 5100M	2010-01-07	GT216	550	1600	1024	128-bit GDDR3	25.6	48	35	MXM-A 3.0	Varies	GeForce GT 330M/Quadro FX 880M	Tesla 2-based
NVS 5200M	2012-06-01	GF117	625	1800	1024	64-bit DDR3	14.4	96	25	MXM	Varies	GeForce 710M/GT 620M	Fermi-based
NVS 5400M	2012-06-01	GF108	660	1800	1024	128-bit DDR3	28.8	96	35	MXM	Varies	GeForce GT 630M/Quadro 1000M	Fermi-based

=== Quadro M ===
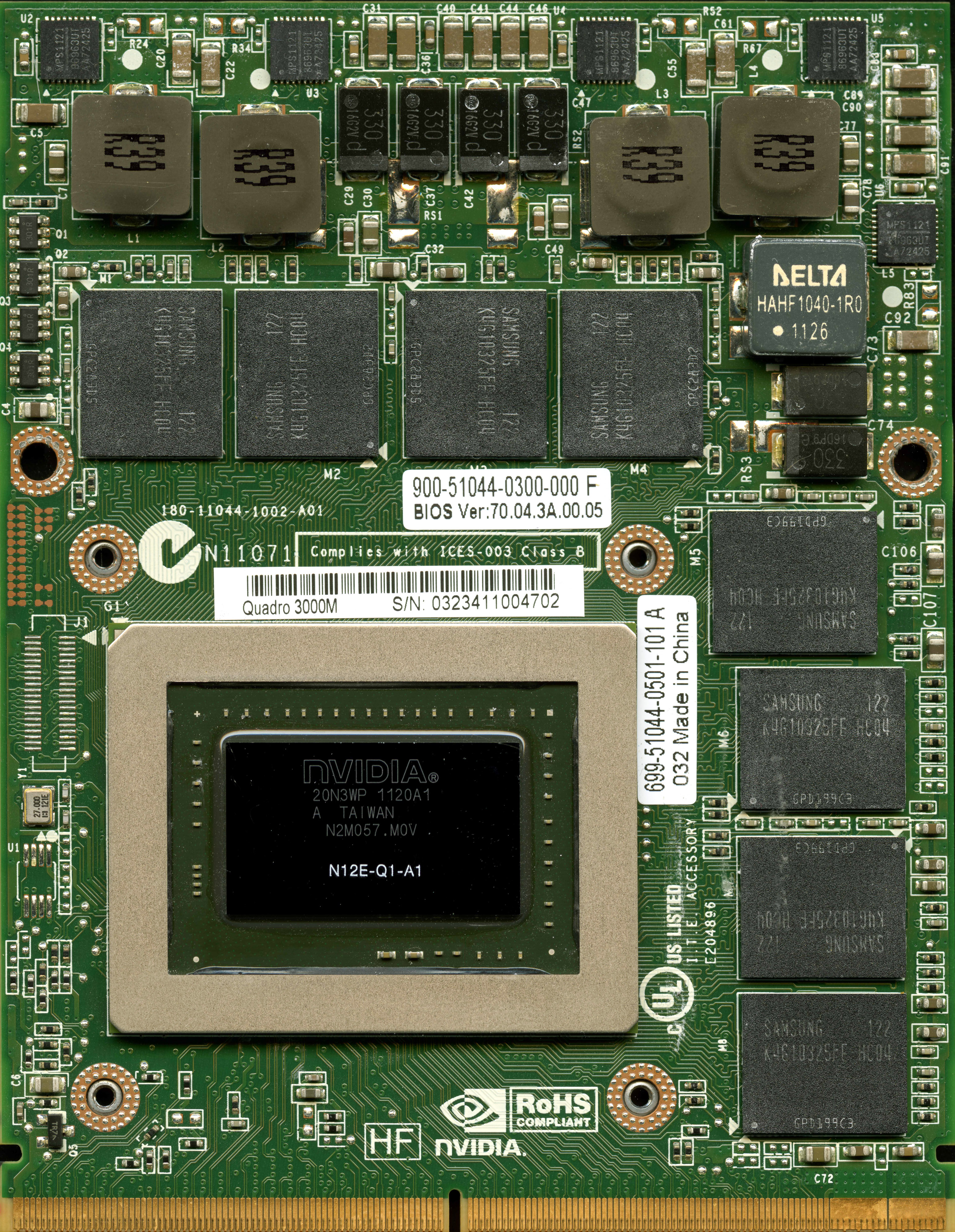
Nvidia Quadro 3000M on a Mobile PCI Express Module

- Architecture Fermi, Kepler, Maxwell, Pascal
- Fermi, Kepler, Maxwell, and Pascal support OpenGL 4.6 with driver versions 381+ on Linux or 390+ on Windows
- All can do Double Precision with compute Capability 1.3 and higher
- Vulkan 1.2 on Kepler and 1.3 on Maxwell and later
- Quadro 5000M has 2048 MB of VRAM, of which 1792 MB is usable with ECC enabled.

Model	Launch	Core	Fab	Bus interface	Core clock	Shader clock	Memory clock effective	Config core	Fillrate		Memory			Bus width	Processing Power (GFLOPs)		API support					TDP
Model	Launch	Core	Fab	Bus interface	Core clock	Shader clock	Memory clock effective	Config core	Pixel	Texture	Size	Band- with	Type	Bus width	Single precision	Double precision	DirectX	OpenGL	CUDA Compute Capability	OpenCL	Vulkan	TDP
Units			nm		MHz	MHz	MHz		GP/s	GT/s	MB	GB/s		bit								Watt
Quadro 1000M	2011-01-13	GF108GLM	40	PCI-E 2.0 ×16	700	1400	1800	96:16:4:4	5.6	11.2	2048	28.8	DDR3	128	269	1/12 of SP	11	4.6	2.1	1.1	No	45
Quadro 2000M	2011-01-13	GF106GLM	40	PCI-E 2.0 ×16	550	1100	1800	192:32:16:4	4.4	17.6	2048	28.8	DDR3	128	422	1/12 of SP	11	4.6	2.1	1.1	No	55
Quadro 3000M	2011-02-22	GF104GLM	40	MXM-B (3.0)	450	900	2500	240:40:32:5	4.5	18	2048	80	GDDR5	256	432	1/12 of SP	11	4.6	2.1	1.1	No	75
Quadro 4000M	2011-02-22	GF104GLM	40	PCI-E 2.0 ×16	475	950	2400	336:56:32:7	6.65	26.6	2048	80	GDDR5	256	638	1/12 of SP	11	4.6	2.1	1.1	No	100
Quadro 5000M	2010-07-27	GF100GLM	40	PCI-E 2.0 ×16	405	810	2400	320:40:32:10	8.10	16.2	2048	76.8	GDDR5	256	518	1/2 of SP	11	4.6	2.0	1.1	No	100
Quadro 5010M	2011-02-22	GF110GLM	40	PCI-E 2.0 ×16	450	900	2600	384:48:32:12	10.8	21.6	4096	83.2	GDDR5	256	691	1/2 of SP	11	4.6	2.0	1.1	No	100
Quadro K500M	2012-06-01	GK107	28	MXM-A (3.0)	850	850	1800	192:16:8:1	3.4	13.6	1024	12.8	DDR3	64	326	1/24 of SP	11.2	4.6	3.0	1.2	1.2	35
Quadro K510M	2013-07-23	GK208	28	MXM-A (3.0)	846	846	2400	192:16:8:1	3.4	13.5	1024	19.2	GDDR5	64	325	1/24 of SP	11.2	4.6	3.5	1.2	1.2	30
Quadro K610M	2013-07-23	GK208	28	PCI-E 2.0 ×8	980	980	2600	192:16:8:1	3.9	15.7	1024	20.8	GDDR5	64	376	1/24 of SP	11.2	4.6	3.5	1.2	1.2	30
Quadro K1000M	2012-06-01	GK107GL	28	PCI-E 3.0 ×16	850	850	1800	192:16:16:1	3.4	13.6	2048	28.8	DDR3	128	326	1/24 of SP	11.2	4.6	3.0	1.2	1.2	45
Quadro K1100M	2013-07-23	GK107GL	28	PCI-E 3.0 ×16	706	706	2800	384:32:16:2	5.65	22.6	2048	44.8	GDDR5	128	542	1/24 of SP	11.2	4.6	3.0	1.2	1.2	45
Quadro K2000M	2012-06-01	GK107	28	mxm-a	745	900	1800	384:32:16:2	5.96	23.84	2048	28.8	DDR3	128	572	1/24 of SP	11.2	4.6	3.0	1.2	1.2	55
Quadro K2100M	2013-07-23	GK106	28	PCI-E 3.0 ×16	667	750	3000	576:48:16:3	8.0	32.0	2048	48.0	GDDR5	128	768	1/24 of SP	11.2	4.6	3.0	1.2	1.2	55
Quadro K3000M	2012-06-01	GK104	28	PCI-E 3.0 ×16	654	654	2800	576:48:32:3	7.85	31.4	2048	89.6	GDDR5	256	753	1/24 of SP	11.2	4.6	3.0	1.2	1.2	75
Quadro K3100M	2013-07-23	GK104	28	PCI-E 3.0 ×16	683	683	3200	768:64:32:4	11.3	45.2	4096	102.4	GDDR5	256	1084	1/24 of SP	11.2	4.6	3.0	1.2	1.2	75
Quadro K4000M	2012-06-01	GK104	28	PCI-E 3.0 ×16	600	600	2800	960:80:32:5	12.0	48.1	4096	89.6	GDDR5	256	1154	1/24 of SP	11.2	4.6	3.0	1.2	1.2	100
Quadro K4100M	2013-07-23	GK104	28	PCI-E 3.0 ×16	706	706	3200	1152:96:32:6	16.9	67.8	4096	102.4	GDDR5	256	1627	1/24 of SP	11.2	4.6	3.0	1.2	1.2	100
Quadro K5000M	2012-08-07	GK104	28	PCI-E 3.0 ×16	706	706	3000	1344:112:32:7	16.8	67.3	4096	96.0	GDDR5	256	1615	1/24 of SP	11.2	4.6	3.0	1.2	1.2	100
Quadro K5100M	2013-07-23	GK104	28	PCI-E 3.0 ×16	771	771	3600	1536:128:32:8	24.7	98.7	8192	115.2	GDDR5	256	2368	1/24 of SP	11.2	4.6	3.0	1.2	1.2	100
Quadro M500M	2016-04-27	GM108	28	PCI-E 3.0 ×16	1029	1124	1800	384:32:16:2	8.2	16.5	2048	14.4	DDR3	64	729	1/32 of SP	12.0	4.6	5.0	3.0	1.3	30
Quadro M520	2017-01-11	GM108	28	MXM-A (3.0)	965	1176	5000	384:16:8:2	9.4	18.8	1024	40	GDDR5	64	840	1/32 of SP	12.0	4.6	5.0	3.0	1.3	25
Quadro M600M	2015-08-18	GM107	28	PCI-E 3.0 ×16	1029	1124	5000	384:32:16:2	8.2	16.5	2048	80	GDDR5	128	790	1/32 of SP	12.0	4.6	5.0	3.0	1.3	30
Quadro M620	2017-01-11	GM107	28	MXM-A (3.0)	756	1018	5012	512:32:16:4	16.3	32.6	2048	80.2	GDDR5	128	1042	1/32 of SP	12.0	4.6	5.0	3.0	1.3	30
Quadro M1000M	2015-08-18	GM107	28	PCI-E 3.0 ×16	1000	1250	5000	512:32:16:4	15.9	31.8	4096	80.2	GDDR5	128	1017	1/32 of SP	12.0	4.6	5.0	3.0	1.3	55
Quadro M1200	2017-01-11	GM107	28	MXM-A (3.0)	991	1148	5012	640:40:16:5	18.4	45.9	4096	80.2	GDDR5	128	1469	1/32 of SP	12.0	4.6	5.0	3.0	1.3	45
Quadro M2000M	2015-12-03	GM107	28	MXM-A (3.0)	1029	1029	5000	640:40:32:5	32.9	41.2	4096	80	GDDR5	128	1317	1/32 of SP	12.0	4.6	5.0	3.0	1.3	55
Quadro M2200	2017-01-11	GM206	28	MXM-A (3.0)	695	1037	5508	1024:64:32:8	33.2	66.3	4096	88.1	GDDR5	128	2124	1/32 of SP	12.1	4.6	5.2	3.0	1.3	55
Quadro M3000M	2015-08-18	GM204	28	PCI-E 3.0 ×16	540	1080	5000	1024:64:32:8	17.3	34.6	4096	160	GDDR5	256	1106	1/32 of SP	12.1	4.6	5.2	3.0	1.3	55
Quadro M4000M	2015-08-18	GM204	28	PCI-E 3.0 ×16	975	1250	5000	1280:80:64:10	62.4	78.0	4096	160.4	GDDR5	256	2496	1/32 of SP	12.1	4.6	5.2	3.0	1.3	100
Quadro M5000M	2015-08-18	GM204	28	PCI-E 3.0 ×16	975	1250	5000	1536:96:64:12	62.4	93.6	8192	160	GDDR5	256	2995	1/32 of SP	12.1	4.6	5.2	3.0	1.3	100
Quadro M5500	2016-04-08	GM204	28	PCI-E 3.0 ×16	861	1140	6606	2048:128:64:16	73	145.9	8192	211	GDDR5	256	4669	1/32 of SP	12.1	4.6	5.2	3.0	1.3	150
Quadro P500	2018-01-05	GP108	14		1455		5012	256:16:16	24.3	24.3	2048	40	GDDR5	64	777	1/32 of SP	12.1	4.6	6.1	3.0	1.3	18
Quadro P600	2017-02-07	GP107	14		1430		5012	384:24:16	24.9	37.4	4096	80	GDDR5	128	1196	1/32 of SP	12.1	4.6	6.1	3.0	1.3	25
Quadro P1000	2017-02-07	GP107	14		1303		6008	512:32:16	23.9	47.8	4096	96	GDDR5	128	1529	1/32 of SP	12.1	4.6	6.1	3.0	1.3	40
Quadro P2000	2017-02-06	GP107	14		1557		6008	768:64:32	51.4	77.1	4096	96	GDDR5	128	2468	1/32 of SP	12.1	4.6	6.1	3.0	1.3	50
Quadro P3000	2017-01-11	GP104	16	MXM-B 3.0 ×16	1210	1210	7012	1280:80:32:10	38.7	96.8	6144	168	GDDR5	192	3098	1/32 of SP	12.1	4.6	6.1	3.0	1.3	75
Quadro P3200	2018-02-21	GP104	16		1328		7012	1792:112:64	98.8	172.8	6144	168	GDDR5	192	5530	1/32 of SP	12.1	4.6	6.1	3.0	1.3	75
Quadro P4000	2017-01-11	GP104	16	MXM-B 3.0 ×16	1227	1227	7012	1792:112:64:14	78.5	137.4	8192	192.3	GDDR5	256	4398	1/32 of SP	12.1	4.6	6.1	3.0	1.3	100
Quadro P4200	2018-02-21	GP104	16	MXM-B 3.0 ×16	1227	1227	6008	2304:144:64:18	105.4	237.2	8192	192.3	GDDR5	256	7589	1/32 of SP	12.1	4.6	6.1	3.0	1.3	100
Quadro P5000	2017-01-11	GP104	16	MXM-B 3.0 ×16	1513	1513	6012	2048:128:64:16	96.8	193.7	16384	192.3	GDDR5	256	6197	1/32 of SP	12.1	4.6	6.1	3.0	1.3	100
Quadro P5200	2018-02-21	GP104	16	MXM-B 3.0 ×16	1556	1556	7200	2560:160:64:20	111.7	279.4	16384	230.4	GDDR5	256	8940	1/32 of SP	12.1	4.6	6.1	3.0	1.3	150

=== Quadro/Quadro RTX/RTX Mobile ===
- Turing (TU10x) microarchitecture
- Ampere (GA10x) microarchitecture
- Ada Lovelace (AD10x) microarchitecture
- Quadro naming dropped beginning with Ampere-based GPUs and later Turing-based GPUs (T500, T600, T1200)
- Quadro RTX/RTX series GPUs have tensor cores and hardware support for realtime ray tracing

Model	Launch	Core	Core clock	Memory clock	Memory				CUDA cores	Tensor cores	RT cores	Processing power		API support					Power max.
Model	Launch	Core	Core clock	Memory clock	Size	Bandwidth	Type	Bus width	CUDA cores	Tensor cores	RT cores	Single precision	Double precision	CUDA Compute Capability	DirectX	OpenGL	OpenCL	Vulkan	Power max.
			MHz	MHz	GiB	GiB/s		bit				TFLOPS	TFLOPS						Watt
Quadro T1000 Mobile	2019-05-27	TU117	1395	2001	4	128.1	GDDR5	128	896	n/a	n/a	2.607	1/32 of SP	7.5	12.0 (12_1)	4.6	3.0	1.3	50
Quadro T2000 Mobile	2019-05-27	TU117	1575	2001	4	128.1	GDDR6	128	1024	n/a	n/a	3.656	1/32 of SP	7.5	12.0 (12_1)	4.6	3.0	1.3	60
Quadro RTX 3000 Mobile	2019-05-27	TU106	1380	1750	6	336	GDDR6	192	2304	240	30	6.4 (Note: TechPowerUp and the Nvidia reference sheet contradict each other on the single precision performance, showing Nvidia's data.)	1/32 of SP	7.5	12.0 (12_2)	4.6	3.0	1.3	80
Quadro RTX 4000 Mobile	2019-05-27	TU104	1560	1750	8	448	GDDR6	256	2560	320	40	8.0	1/32 of SP	7.5	12.0 (12_2)	4.6	3.0	1.3	110
Quadro RTX 5000 Mobile	2019-05-27	TU104	1770	1750	16	448	GDDR6	256	3072	384	48	9.4	1/32 of SP	7.5	12.0 (12_2)	4.6	3.0	1.3	110
Quadro RTX 6000 Mobile	2019-09-04	TU102	1455	1750	24	672	GDDR6	384	4608	576	72	14.9	1/32 of SP	7.5	12.0 (12_2)	4.6	3.0	1.3	250
RTX A2000 Mobile	2021-04-12	GA106	1358	1375	4	192	GDDR6	128	2560	80	20	9.3	1/32 of SP	8.6	12.0 (12_2)	4.6	3.0	1.3	95
RTX A3000 Mobile	2021-04-12	GA104	1560	1375	6	264	GDDR6	192	4096	128	32	12.8	1/32 of SP	8.6	12.0 (12_2)	4.6	3.0	1.3	130
RTX A4000 Mobile	2021-04-12	GA104	1680	1500	8	384	GDDR6	256	5120	160	40	17.8	1/32 of SP	8.6	12.0 (12_2)	4.6	3.0	1.3	140
RTX A5000 Mobile	2021-04-12	GA104	1575	1750	16	448	GDDR6	256	6144	192	48	21.7	1/32 of SP	8.6	12.0 (12_2)	4.6	3.0	1.3	230
RTX 500 Ada Mobile	2024-02-26	AD107	2025	2000	4	128	GDDR6	64	2048	64	16	9.2	1/32 of SP	?	12.0 (12_2)	4.6	3.0	1.3	60
RTX 1000 Ada Mobile	2024-02-26	AD107	2025	2000	6	192	GDDR6	96	2560	80	20	12.1	1/32 of SP	?	12.0 (12_2)	4.6	3.0	1.3	140
RTX 2000 Ada Mobile	2023-03-21	AD107	2115	2000	8	256	GDDR6	128	3072	96	24	14.5	1/32 of SP	?	12.0 (12_2)	4.6	3.0	1.3	140
RTX 3000 Ada Mobile	2023-03-21	AD106	1695	2000	8 ECC	256	GDDR6	128	4608	144	36	19.9	1/32 of SP	?	12.0 (12_2)	4.6	3.0	1.3	140
RTX 3500 Ada Mobile	2023-03-21	AD104	1545	2250	12 ECC	432	GDDR6	192	5120	160	40	23.0	1/32 of SP	?	12.0 (12_2)	4.6	3.0	1.3	140
RTX 4000 Ada Mobile	2023-03-21	AD104	1665	2250	12 ECC	432	GDDR6	192	7424	232	58	33.6	1/32 of SP	?	12.0 (12_2)	4.6	3.0	1.3	175
RTX 5000 Ada Mobile	2023-03-21	AD103	2115	2250	16 ECC	576	GDDR6	256	9728	304	76	42.6	1/32 of SP	?	12.0 (12_2)	4.6	3.0	1.3	175

== NVENC and NVDEC support matrix ==
Hardware accelerated video encoding (via NVENC) and decoding (via NVDEC) is supported on NVIDIA Quadro products with Kepler, Maxwell, Pascal, Turing, Ampere and Ada generation GPUs. Fermi based GPUs support decoding only.

NVENC – Encoding
Board	Family	Chip	Server/ Desktop/ Mobile	# of NVENC/chip	Max # of concurrent sessions	H.264 (AVCHD) YUV 4:2:0	H.264 (AVCHD) YUV 4:4:4	H.264 (AVCHD) Lossless	H.265 (HEVC) 4K YUV 4:2:0	H.265 (HEVC) 4K YUV 4:4:4	H.265 (HEVC) 4K Lossless	H.265 (HEVC) 8k	HEVC B Frame support
Quadro K420 / K600	Kepler	GK107	D	1	3	Yes	No	No	No	No	No	No	No
Quadro K2000 / K2000D	Kepler	GK107	D	1	Unrestricted	Yes	No	No	No	No	No	No	No
Quadro K2100 > K5100	Kepler	GK106	M	1	Unrestricted	Yes	No	No	No	No	No	No	No
Quadro K4000	Kepler	GK106	D	1	Unrestricted	Yes	No	No	No	No	No	No	No
Quadro K100 > K2000 + K5100	Kepler	GK104	M	1	Unrestricted	Yes	No	No	No	No	No	No	No
Quadro K4200 / K5000	Kepler	GK104	D	1	Unrestricted	Yes	No	No	No	No	No	No	No
Quadro K5200 / K6000	Kepler (2nd Gen)	GK110B	D	1	Unrestricted	Yes	No	No	No	No	No	No	No
Quadro K620 / K1200	Maxwell (1st Gen)	GM107	D	1	3	Yes	Yes	Yes	No	No	No	No	No
Quadro K2200	Maxwell (1st Gen)	GM107	D	1	Unrestricted	Yes	Yes	Yes	No	No	No	No	No
Quadro M500 / M520	Maxwell (1st Gen)	GM108	M	0	n/a	No	No	No	No	No	No	No	No
Quadro M600 / M620	Maxwell (1st Gen)	GM107	M	1	Unrestricted	Yes	Yes	Yes	No	No	No	No	No
Quadro M1000 / M1200 / M2000	Maxwell (1st Gen)	GM107	M	1	Unrestricted	Yes	Yes	Yes	No	No	No	No	No
Quadro M2000	Maxwell (GM206)	GM206	D	1	Unrestricted	Yes	Yes	Yes	Yes	No	No	No	No
Quadro M2200	Maxwell (GM206)	GM206	M	1	Unrestricted	Yes	Yes	Yes	Yes	No	No	No	No
Quadro M3000 / M4000 / M5500	Maxwell (2nd Gen)	GM204	M	2	Unrestricted	Yes	Yes	Yes	Yes	No	No	No	No
Quadro M4000 / M5000	Maxwell (2nd Gen)	GM204	D	2	Unrestricted	Yes	Yes	Yes	Yes	No	No	No	No
Quadro M6000	Maxwell (2nd Gen)	GM200	D	2	Unrestricted	Yes	Yes	Yes	Yes	No	No	No	No
Quadro P500 / P520	Pascal	GP108	M	1	3	No	No	No	No	No	No	No	No
Quadro P400	Pascal	GP107	D	1	3	Yes	Yes	Yes	Yes	Yes	Yes	Yes	No
Quadro P600 / P620/ P1000	Pascal	GP107	D/M	1	3	Yes	Yes	Yes	Yes	Yes	Yes	Yes	No
Quadro P2000	Pascal	GP107	M	1	Unrestricted	Yes	Yes	Yes	Yes	Yes	Yes	Yes	No
Quadro P2000 / P2200	Pascal	GP106	D	1	Unrestricted	Yes	Yes	Yes	Yes	Yes	Yes	Yes	No
Quadro P3200 / P4200 / P5200	Pascal	GP104	M	2	Unrestricted	Yes	Yes	Yes	Yes	Yes	Yes	Yes	No
Quadro P4000	Pascal	GP104	D	1	Unrestricted	Yes	Yes	Yes	Yes	Yes	Yes	Yes	No
Quadro P5000	Pascal	GP104	D	2	Unrestricted	Yes	Yes	Yes	Yes	Yes	Yes	Yes	No
Quadro P6000	Pascal	GP102	D	2	Unrestricted	Yes	Yes	Yes	Yes	Yes	Yes	Yes	No
Quadro GP100	Pascal	GP100	D	3	Unrestricted	Yes	Yes	Yes	Yes	Yes	Yes	No	No
Quadro GV100	Volta	GV100	D	3	Unrestricted	Yes	Yes	Yes	Yes	Yes	Yes	Yes	No
Quadro T1000	Turing	TU117	M	1	3	Yes	Yes	Yes	Yes	Yes	Yes	Yes	Yes
Quadro T2000	Turing	TU117	M	1	Unrestricted	Yes	Yes	Yes	Yes	Yes	Yes	Yes	Yes
Quadro RTX 3000	Turing	TU106	M	1	Unrestricted	Yes	Yes	Yes	Yes	Yes	Yes	Yes	Yes
Quadro RTX 5000/RTX 4000	Turing	TU104	D/M	1	Unrestricted	Yes	Yes	Yes	Yes	Yes	Yes	Yes	Yes
Quadro RTX 6000/RTX 8000	Turing	TU102	D	1	Unrestricted	Yes	Yes	Yes	Yes	Yes	Yes	Yes	Yes

NVDEC – Decoding
Board	Family	Chip	Desktop/ Mobile/ Server	# Of Chips	# Of NVDEC /Chip	Total # of NDEC	MPEG-1	MPEG-2	VC-1	VP8	VP9			H.264 (AVCHD)	H.265 (HEVC) 4:2:0			H.265 (HEVC) 4:4:4		
Board	Family	Chip	Desktop/ Mobile/ Server	# Of Chips	# Of NVDEC /Chip	Total # of NDEC	MPEG-1	MPEG-2	VC-1	VP8	8 bit	10 bit	12 bit	H.264 (AVCHD)	8 bit	10 bit	12 bit	8 bit	10 bit	12 bit
Quadro K420 / K600	Kepler	GK107	D	1	1	1	Yes	Yes	Yes	No	No	No	No	Yes	No	No	No	No	No	No
Quadro K2000 / K2000D	Kepler	GK107	D	1	1	1	Yes	Yes	Yes	No	No	No	No	Yes	No	No	No	No	No	No
Quadro K2100 > K5100	Kepler	GK106	M	1	1	1	Yes	Yes	Yes	No	No	No	No	Yes	No	No	No	No	No	No
Quadro K4000	Kepler	GK106	D	1	1	1	Yes	Yes	Yes	No	No	No	No	Yes	No	No	No	No	No	No
Quadro K100 > K2000 + K5100	Kepler	GK104	M	1	1	1	Yes	Yes	Yes	No	No	No	No	Yes	No	No	No	No	No	No
Quadro K4200 / K5000	Kepler	GK104	D	1	1	1	Yes	Yes	Yes	No	No	No	No	Yes	No	No	No	No	No	No
Quadro K5200 / K6000	Kepler (2nd Gen)	GK110B	D	1	1	1	Yes	Yes	Yes	No	No	No	No	Yes	No	No	No	No	No	No
Quadro K620 / K1200	Maxwell (1st Gen)	GM107	D	1	1	1	Yes	Yes	Yes	No	No	No	No	Yes	No	No	No	No	No	No
Quadro K2200	Maxwell (1st Gen)	GM107	D	1	1	1	Yes	Yes	Yes	No	No	No	No	Yes	No	No	No	No	No	No
Quadro M500 / M520	Maxwell (1st Gen)	GM108	M	1	0	0	No	No	No	No	No	No	No	No	No	No	No	No	No	No
Quadro M600 / M620	Maxwell (1st Gen)	GM107	M	1	1	1	Yes	Yes	Yes	No	No	No	No	Yes	No	No	No	No	No	No
Quadro M1000 / M1200 / M2000	Maxwell (1st Gen)	GM107	M	1	1	1	Yes	Yes	Yes	No	No	No	No	Yes	No	No	No	No	No	No
Quadro M2000	Maxwell (GM206)	GM206	D	1	1	1	Yes	Yes	Yes	Yes	Yes	No	No	Yes	Yes	Yes	No	No	No	No
Quadro M2200	Maxwell (GM206)	GM206	M	1	1	1	Yes	Yes	Yes	Yes	Yes	No	No	Yes	Yes	Yes	No	No	No	No
Quadro M3000 / M4000 / M5500	Maxwell (2nd Gen)	GM204	M	1	1	1	Yes	Yes	Yes	Yes	No	No	No	Yes	No	No	No	No	No	No
Quadro M4000 / M5000	Maxwell (2nd Gen)	GM204	D	1	1	1	Yes	Yes	Yes	Yes	No	No	No	Yes	No	No	No	No	No	No
Quadro M6000	Maxwell (2nd Gen)	GM200	D	1	1	1	Yes	Yes	Yes	Yes	No	No	No	Yes	No	No	No	No	No	No
Quadro P500 / P520	Pascal	GP108	M	0	0	0	No	No	No	No	No	No	No	No	No	No	No	No	No	No
Quadro P400	Pascal	GP107	D	1	1	1	Yes	Yes	Yes	No	Yes	Yes	Yes	Yes	Yes	Yes	Yes	No	No	No
Quadro P600 / P620/ P1000	Pascal	GP107	D/M	1	1	1	Yes	Yes	Yes	No	Yes	Yes	Yes	Yes	Yes	Yes	Yes	No	No	No
Quadro P2000	Pascal	GP107	M	1	1	1	Yes	Yes	Yes	No	Yes	Yes	Yes	Yes	Yes	Yes	Yes	No	No	No
Quadro P2000 / P2200	Pascal	GP106	D	1	1	1	Yes	Yes	Yes	No	Yes	Yes	Yes	Yes	Yes	Yes	Yes	No	No	No
Quadro P3200 / P4200 / P5200	Pascal	GP104	M	1	1	1	Yes	Yes	Yes	Yes	Yes	No	No	Yes	Yes	Yes	Yes	No	No	No
Quadro P4000 / P5000	Pascal	GP104	D	1	1	1	Yes	Yes	Yes	Yes	Yes	No	No	Yes	Yes	Yes	Yes	No	No	No
Quadro P6000	Pascal	GP102	D	1	1	1	Yes	Yes	Yes	No	Yes	Yes	Yes	Yes	Yes	Yes	Yes	No	No	No
Quadro GP100	Pascal	GP100	D	1	1	1	Yes	Yes	Yes	Yes	Yes	No	No	Yes	Yes	Yes	Yes	No	No	No
Quadro GV100	Volta	GV100	D	1	1	1	Yes	Yes	Yes	Yes	Yes	Yes	Yes	Yes	Yes	Yes	Yes	No	No	No
Quadro T1000 / T2000	Turing	TU117	M	1	1	1	Yes	Yes	Yes	Yes	Yes	Yes	Yes	Yes	Yes	Yes	Yes	Yes	Yes	Yes
Quadro RTX 3000	Turing	TU106	M	1	3	3	Yes	Yes	Yes	Yes	Yes	Yes	Yes	Yes	Yes	Yes	Yes	Yes	Yes	Yes
Quadro RTX 4000/RTX 5000	Turing	TU104	D/M	1	2	2	Yes	Yes	Yes	Yes	Yes	Yes	Yes	Yes	Yes	Yes	Yes	Yes	Yes	Yes
Quadro RTX 6000/RTX 8000	Turing	TU102	D	1	1	1	Yes	Yes	Yes	Yes	Yes	Yes	Yes	Yes	Yes	Yes	Yes	Yes	Yes	Yes

== Driver and SDK Software ==
=== Quadro/RTX drivers ===
- Curie-Architecture Last drivers see Driver Portal of Nvidia (End-of-Life)
- Tesla-Architecture (G80+, GT2xx) in Legacy Mode Quadro Driver 340: OpenGL 3.3, OpenCL 1.1, DirectX 10.0/10.1 (End-of-Life)
- Fermi (GFxxx): OpenCL 1.1, OpenGL 4.5, some OpenGL 2016 Features with Quadro Driver 375, in legacy mode with version 392.68 (End-of-Life)
- Kepler (GKxxx): OpenCL 1.2, OpenGL 4.6, Vulkan 1.2 with RTX Enterprise/Quadro Driver 470 (End-of-Life)
- Maxwell (GMxxx): OpenCL 3.0, OpenGL 4.6, Vulkan 1.3 with RTX Enterprise/Quadro Driver 550+
- Pascal (GPxxx): OpenCL 3.0, OpenGL 4.6, Vulkan 1.3 with RTX Enterprise/Quadro driver 550+
- Volta (GVxxx): OpenCL 3.0, OpenGL 4.6, Vulkan 1.3 with RTX Enterprise/Quadro driver 550+
- Turing (TUxxx): OpenCL 3.0, OpenGL 4.6, Vulkan 1.3 with RTX Enterprise/Quadro driver 550+
- Ampere (GAxxx): OpenCL 3.0, OpenGL 4.6, Vulkan 1.3 with RTX Enterprise/Quadro driver 550+
- Ada Lovelace (ADxxx): OpenCL 3.0, OpenGL 4.6, Vulkan 1.3 with RTX Enterprise/Quadro driver 550+

=== CUDA ===
- Tesla Architecture and later

Supported CUDA Level of GPU and Card.

- CUDA SDK 6.5 support for Compute Capability 1.0 – 5.x (Tesla, Fermi, Kepler, Maxwell) Last Version with support for Tesla-Architecture with Compute Capability 1.x
- CUDA SDK 7.5 support for Compute Capability 2.0 – 5.x (Fermi, Kepler, Maxwell)
- CUDA SDK 8.0 support for Compute Capability 2.0 – 6.x (Fermi, Kepler, Maxwell, Pascal) Last version with support for compute capability 2.x (Fermi)
- CUDA SDK 9.0/9.1/9.2 support for Compute Capability 3.0 – 7.2 (Kepler, Maxwell, Pascal, Volta)
- CUDA SDK 10.0/10.1/10.2 support for Compute Capability 3.0 – 7.5 (Kepler, Maxwell, Pascal, Volta, Turing) Last version with support for compute capability 3.x (Kepler).
- CUDA SDK 11.0/11.1/11.2/11.3/11.4/11.5/11.6/11.7 support for Compute Capability 3.5 – 8.9 (Kepler(GK110, GK208, GK210 only), Maxwell, Pascal, Volta, Turing, Ampere, Ada Lovelace)
- CUDA SDK 11.8 support for Compute Capability 3.5 – 8.9 (Kepler(GK110, GK208, GK210 only), Maxwell, Pascal, Volta, Turing, Ampere, Ada Lovelace)
- CUDA SDK 12.0 support for Compute Capability 5.0 – 8.9 (Maxwell, Pascal, Volta, Turing, Ampere, Ada Lovelace)

== See also ==
- Comparison of Nvidia graphics processing units
- List of Nvidia graphics processing units
- CUDA – Nvidia CUDA technology
- Nvidia Tesla – Nvidia's first dedicated general purpose graphics processing unit (GPGPU)
- Nvidia RTX – Nvidia's latest high-end graphics rendering development platform
- Sun Visualization System – uses Nvidia Quadro FX for 3D rendering and graphics acceleration
- Nvidia NVDEC
- Nvidia NVENC
