= Ampere (microarchitecture) =

GPU microarchitecture by Nvidia

- Launched: May 14, 2020; 6 years ago
- Designed by: Nvidia
- Manufactured by: TSMC; Samsung
- Fabrication process: TSMC N7 (professional); Samsung 8N (consumer)
- Codename: GA10x

Product series
- Desktop: GeForce RTX 30 series
- Professional/workstation: RTX A series
- Server/datacenter: A100

Specifications
- L1 cache: 192 KB per SM (professional); 128 KB per SM (consumer)
- L2 cache: 2 MB to 6 MB
- Memory support: GDDR6; GDDR6X; HBM2
- PCIe support: PCIe 4.0

Supported graphics APIs
- DirectX: DirectX 12 Ultimate (Feature Level 12_2)
- Direct3D: Direct3D 12.0
- Shader model: Shader Model 6.8
- OpenGL: OpenGL 4.6
- CUDA: Compute Capability 8.6
- Vulkan: Vulkan 1.4

Supported compute APIs
- OpenCL: OpenCL 3.0

Media engine
- Encode codecs: H.264; H.265
- Decode codecs: H.264; H.265; AV1
- Color bit-depth: 8-bit; 10-bit
- Encoder supported: NVENC
- Display outputs: DisplayPort 1.4a; HDMI 2.1

History
- Predecessor: Turing (consumer); Volta (professional)
- Successor: Ada Lovelace (consumer); Hopper (datacenter)

Support status
- Supported

Ampere is the codename for a graphics processing unit (GPU) microarchitecture developed by Nvidia as the successor to both the Volta and Turing architectures. It was officially announced on May 14, 2020, and is named after French mathematician and physicist André-Marie Ampère.

Nvidia announced the Ampere architecture GeForce 30 series consumer GPUs at a GeForce Special Event on September 1, 2020. Nvidia announced the A100 80 GB GPU at SC20 on November 16, 2020. Mobile RTX graphics cards and the RTX 3060 based on the Ampere architecture were revealed on January 12, 2021.

Nvidia announced Ampere's successor, Hopper, at GTC 2022, and "Ampere Next Next" (Blackwell) for a 2024 release at GPU Technology Conference 2021.

== Details ==
Architectural improvements of the Ampere architecture include the following:

- CUDA Compute Capability 8.0 for A100 and 8.6 for the GeForce 30 series
- TSMC's 7 nm FinFET process for A100
- Custom version of Samsung's 8 nm process (8N) for the GeForce 30 series
- Third-generation Tensor Cores with FP16, bfloat16, TensorFloat-32 (TF32) and FP64 support and sparsity acceleration. The individual Tensor cores have with 256 FP16 FMA operations per clock 4x processing power (GA100 only, 2x on GA10x) compared to previous Tensor Core generations; the Tensor Core Count is reduced to one per SM.
- Second-generation ray tracing cores; concurrent ray tracing, shading, and compute for the GeForce 30 series
- High Bandwidth Memory 2 (HBM2) on A100 40 GB & A100 80 GB
- GDDR6X memory for GeForce RTX 3090, RTX 3080 Ti, RTX 3080, RTX 3070 Ti
- Double FP32 cores per SM on GA10x GPUs
- NVLink 3.0 with a 50 Gbit/s per pair throughput
- PCI Express 4.0 with SR-IOV support (SR-IOV is reserved only for A100)
- Multi-instance GPU (MIG) virtualization and spatial GPU partitioning feature in A100 supporting up to seven instances
- PureVideo feature set K hardware video decoding with AV1 hardware decoding for the GeForce 30 series and feature set J for A100
- 5 NVDEC for A100
- Adds new hardware-based 5-core JPEG decode (NVJPG) with YUV420, YUV422, YUV444, YUV400, RGBA. Should not be confused with Nvidia NVJPEG (GPU-accelerated library for JPEG encoding/decoding)

=== Chips ===
- GA100
- GA102
- GA103
- GA104
- GA106
- GA107
- GA10B

Comparison of Compute Capability: GP100 vs GV100 vs GA100

GPU features	Nvidia Tesla P100	Nvidia Tesla V100	Nvidia A100
GPU codename	GP100	GV100	GA100
GPU architecture	Pascal	Volta	Ampere
Compute capability	6.0	7.0	8.0
Threads / warp	32	32	32
Max warps / SM	64	64	64
Max threads / SM	2048	2048	2048
Max thread blocks / SM	32	32	32
Max 32-bit registers / SM	65536	65536	65536
Max registers / block	65536	65536	65536
Max registers / thread	255	255	255
Max thread block size	1024	1024	1024
FP32 cores / SM	64	64	64
Ratio of SM registers to FP32 cores	1024	1024	1024
Shared Memory Size / SM	64 KB	Configurable up to 96 KB	Configurable up to 164 KB

Comparison of Precision Support Matrix

	Supported CUDA Core Precisions								Supported Tensor Core Precisions							
	FP16	FP32	FP64	INT1	INT4	INT8	TF32	BF16	FP16	FP32	FP64	INT1	INT4	INT8	TF32	BF16
Nvidia Tesla P4	No	Yes	Yes	No	No	Yes	No	No	No	No	No	No	No	No	No	No
Nvidia P100	Yes	Yes	Yes	No	No	No	No	No	No	No	No	No	No	No	No	No
Nvidia Volta	Yes	Yes	Yes	No	No	Yes	No	No	Yes	No	No	No	No	No	No	No
Nvidia Turing	Yes	Yes	Yes	No	No	No	No	No	Yes	No	No	Yes	Yes	Yes	No	No
Nvidia A100	Yes	Yes	Yes	No	No	Yes	No	Yes	Yes	No	Yes	Yes	Yes	Yes	Yes	Yes

Legend:

- FPnn: floating point with nn bits
- INTn: integer with n bits
- INT1: binary
- TF32: TensorFloat32
- BF16: bfloat16

Comparison of Decode Performance

Concurrent streams	H.264 decode (1080p30)	H.265 (HEVC) decode (1080p30)	VP9 decode (1080p30)
V100	16	22	22
A100	75	157	108

== Ampere dies ==
Die	GA100	GA102	GA103	GA104	GA106	GA107	GA10B	GA10F
Die size	826 mm^{2}	628 mm^{2}	496 mm^{2}	392 mm^{2}	276 mm^{2}	200 mm^{2}	448 mm^{2}	?
Transistors	54.2B	28.3B	22B	17.4B	12B	8.7B	21B	?
Transistor density	65.6 MTr/mm^{2}	45.1 MTr/mm^{2}	44.4 MTr/mm^{2}	44.4 MTr/mm^{2}	43.5 MTr/mm^{2}	43.5 MTr/mm^{2}	46.9 MTr/mm^{2}	?
Graphics processing clusters	8	7	6	6	3	2	2	1
Streaming multiprocessors	128	84	60	48	30	20	16	12
CUDA cores	8192	10752	7680	6144	3840	2560	2048	1536
Texture mapping units	512	336	240	192	120	80	64	48
Render output units	192	112	96	96	48	32	32	16
Tensor cores	512	336	240	192	120	80	64	48
RT cores	N/A	84	60	48	30	20	8	12
L1 cache	24 MB	10.5 MB	7.5 MB	6 MB	3 MB	2.5 MB	3 MB	1.5 MB
L1 cache	192 KB per SM	128 KB per SM					192 KB per SM	128 KB per SM
L2 cache	40 MB	6 MB	4 MB	4 MB	3 MB	2 MB	4 MB	1 MB

== A100 accelerator and DGX A100 ==
The Ampere-based A100 accelerator was announced and released on May 14, 2020. The A100 features 19.5 teraflops of FP32 performance, 6912 FP32/INT32 CUDA cores, 3456 FP64 CUDA cores, 40 GB of graphics memory, and 1.6 TB/s of graphics memory bandwidth. The A100 accelerator was initially available only in the 3rd generation of DGX server, including 8 A100s. Also included in the DGX A100 is 15 TB of PCIe gen 4 NVMe storage, two 64-core AMD Rome 7742 CPUs, 1 TB of RAM, and Mellanox-powered HDR InfiniBand interconnect. The initial price for the DGX A100 was $199,000.

Starting from P100, to V100, to A100, to H100, to B200 and to R100; the comparison of accelerators used in DGX:

=== General & Architecture ===
Model	Architecture	Socket	GPU	Fabrication Process	Transistor count (billion)	Die size (mm^{2})	Launched
P100	Pascal	SXM/SXM2	GP100	TSMC 16FF+	15.3	610	Q2 2016
V100 16GB	Volta	SXM2	GV100	TSMC 12FFN	21.1	815	Q3 2017
V100 32GB	Volta	SXM3	GV100	TSMC 12FFN	21.1	815	Q3 2017
A100 40GB	Ampere	SXM4	GA100	TSMC N7	54.2	826	Q1 2020
A100 80GB	Ampere	SXM4	GA100	TSMC N7	54.2	826	Q4 2020
H100	Hopper	SXM5	GH100	TSMC 4N	80	814	Q3 2022
H200	Hopper	SXM5	GH100	TSMC 4N	80	814	Q3 2023
B100	Blackwell	SXM6	GB100	TSMC 4NP	208	N/A	Q4 2024
B200	Blackwell	SXM6	GB100	TSMC 4NP	208	N/A	Q4 2024
R100	Rubin	SXM7	—N/a	TSMC 3N	338	—N/a	H2 2026

=== Cores, Clock & Power ===
Model	Boost clock (MHz)	#SM	Cores (FP32 CUDA)	Cores (FP64 excl. tensor)	Cores (Mixed INT32/FP32)	Cores (INT32)	TDP (W)
P100	1480	56	3584	1792	—N/a	—N/a	300
V100 16GB	1530	80	5120	2560	N/A	5120	300
V100 32GB	1530	80	5120	2560	N/A	5120	350
A100 40GB	1410	108	6912	3456	6912	N/A	400
A100 80GB	1410	108	6912	3456	6912	N/A	400
H100	1980	132	16896	4608	16896	N/A	700
H200	1980	132	16896	4608	16896	N/A	1000
B100	—N/a	—N/a	—N/a	—N/a	—N/a	—N/a	700
B200	—N/a	—N/a	—N/a	—N/a	—N/a	—N/a	1000
R100	—N/a	—N/a	—N/a	—N/a	—N/a	—N/a	2300

=== Memory & Cache ===
Model	Memory Type (HBM)	VRAM Size (GB)	Memory Speed (Gb/s)	Bus width (bits)	Bandwidth (TB/s)	L1 Cache Per SM (KB)	L1 Cache Total (KB)	L2 Cache (KB)
P100	HBM2	16	1.4	4096	0.72	24	1344	4096
V100 16GB	HBM2	16	1.75	4096	0.9	128	10240	6144
V100 32GB	HBM2	32	1.75	4096	0.9	128	10240	6144
A100 40GB	HBM2	40	2.4	5120	1.52	192	20736	40960
A100 80GB	HBM2e	80	3.2	5120	1.52	192	20736	40960
H100	HBM3	80	5.2	5120	3.35	192	25344	51200
H200	HBM3e	141	6.3	6144	4.8	192	25344	51200
B100	HBM3e	192	8	8192	8	N/A	N/A	N/A
B200	HBM3e	192	8	8192	8	N/A	N/A	N/A
R100	HBM4	—N/a	—N/a	—N/a	—N/a	—N/a	—N/a	—N/a

=== Compute Performance, Interconnect & Networking ===
Model	FP32 (TFLOPS)	FP64 (TFLOPS)	INT8 dense tensor	FP16 dense tensor	bfloat16 dense tensor	TF32 dense tensor	FP64 dense tensor	Interconnect (NVLink; TB/s)	Networking
P100	10.6	5.3	—N/a	21.2	—N/a	—N/a	—N/a	0.16	ConnectX-4 (100 Gb/s)
V100 16GB	15.7	7.8	N/A	125 TFLOPS	N/A	N/A	N/A	0.3	ConnectX-5 (100 Gb/s)
V100 32GB	15.7	7.8	N/A	125 TFLOPS	N/A	N/A	N/A	0.3	ConnectX-5 (100 Gb/s)
A100 40GB	19.5	9.7	624 TOPS	312 TFLOPS	312 TFLOPS	156 TFLOPS	19.5 TFLOPS	0.6	ConnectX-6 (200 Gb/s)
A100 80GB	19.5	9.7	624 TOPS	312 TFLOPS	312 TFLOPS	156 TFLOPS	19.5 TFLOPS	0.6	ConnectX-6 (200 Gb/s)
H100	67	34	1.98 POPS	990 TFLOPS	990 TFLOPS	495 TFLOPS	67 TFLOPS	0.9	ConnectX-7 (400 Gb/s)
H200	67	34	1.98 POPS	990 TFLOPS	990 TFLOPS	495 TFLOPS	67 TFLOPS	0.9	ConnectX-7 (400 Gb/s)
B100	—N/a	—N/a	3.5 POPS	1.98 PFLOPS	1.98 PFLOPS	989 TFLOPS	30 TFLOPS	1.8	ConnectX-7 (400 Gb/s)
B200	—N/a	—N/a	4.5 POPS	2.25 PFLOPS	2.25 PFLOPS	1.2 PFLOPS	40 TFLOPS	1.8	ConnectX-7 (400 Gb/s)
R100	—N/a	—N/a	—N/a	—N/a	—N/a	—N/a	—N/a	—N/a	ConnectX-9 (1600 Gb/s)

== Products using Ampere ==
- GeForce MX series
  - GeForce MX570 (mobile) (GA107)
- GeForce 20 series
  - GeForce RTX 2050 (mobile) (GA107)
- GeForce 30 series
  - GeForce RTX 3050 Laptop GPU (GA107)
  - GeForce RTX 3050 (GA106 or GA107)
  - GeForce RTX 3050 Ti Laptop GPU (GA107)
  - GeForce RTX 3060 Laptop GPU (GA106)
  - GeForce RTX 3060 (GA106 or GA104)
  - GeForce RTX 3060 Ti (GA104 or GA103)
  - GeForce RTX 3070 Laptop GPU (GA104)
  - GeForce RTX 3070 (GA104)
  - GeForce RTX 3070 Ti Laptop GPU (GA104)
  - GeForce RTX 3070 Ti (GA104 or GA102)
  - GeForce RTX 3080 Laptop GPU (GA104)
  - GeForce RTX 3080 (GA102)
  - GeForce RTX 3080 12 GB (GA102)
  - GeForce RTX 3080 Ti Laptop GPU (GA103)
  - GeForce RTX 3080 Ti (GA102)
  - GeForce RTX 3090 (GA102)
  - GeForce RTX 3090 Ti (GA102)
- Nvidia Workstation GPUs (formerly Quadro)
  - RTX A1000 (mobile) (GA107)
  - RTX A2000 (mobile) (GA106)
  - RTX A2000 (GA106)
  - RTX A3000 (mobile) (GA104)
  - RTX A4000 (mobile) (GA104)
  - RTX A4000 (GA104)
  - RTX A5000 (mobile) (GA104)
  - RTX A5500 (mobile) (GA103)
  - RTX A4500 (GA102)
  - RTX A5000 (GA102)
  - RTX A5500 (GA102)
  - RTX A6000 (GA102)
  - A800 Active
- Nvidia Data Center GPUs (formerly Tesla)
  - Nvidia A2 (GA107)
  - Nvidia A10 (GA102)
  - Nvidia A16 (4 × GA107)
  - Nvidia A30 (GA100)
  - Nvidia A40 (GA102)
  - Nvidia A100 (GA100)
  - Nvidia A100 80 GB (GA100)
  - Nvidia A100X
  - NVIDIA A30X
- Tegra SoCs
  - AGX Orin (GA10B)
  - Orin NX (GA10B)
  - Orin Nano (GA10B)
  - T239 (Nintendo Switch 2, GA10F)

Products using Ampere (per Chip)
Type	GA10B	GA107	GA106	GA104	GA103	GA102	GA100
GeForce MX series	—N/a	GeForce MX570 (mobile)	—N/a	—N/a	—N/a	—N/a	—N/a
GeForce 20 series	—N/a	GeForce RTX 2050 (mobile)	—N/a	—N/a	—N/a	—N/a	—N/a
GeForce 30 series	—N/a	GeForce RTX 3050 Laptop; GeForce RTX 3050; GeForce RTX 3050 Ti Laptop	GeForce RTX 3050; GeForce RTX 3060 Laptop; GeForce RTX 3060	GeForce RTX 3060; GeForce RTX 3060 Ti; GeForce RTX 3070 Laptop; GeForce RTX 3070; GeForce RTX 3070 Ti Laptop; GeForce RTX 3070 Ti; GeForce RTX 3080 Laptop	GeForce RTX 3060 Ti; GeForce RTX 3080 Ti Laptop	GeForce RTX 3070 Ti; GeForce RTX 3080; GeForce RTX 3080 Ti; GeForce RTX 3090; GeForce RTX 3090 Ti	—N/a
Nvidia Workstation GPUs	—N/a	RTX A1000 (mobile)	RTX A2000 (mobile); RTX A2000	RTX A3000 (mobile); RTX A4000 (mobile); RTX A4000; RTX A5000 (mobile)	RTX A5500 (mobile)	RTX A4500; RTX A5000; RTX A5500; RTX A6000	—N/a
Nvidia Data Center GPUs	—N/a	Nvidia A2; Nvidia A16	—N/a	—N/a	—N/a	Nvidia A10; Nvidia A40	Nvidia A30; Nvidia A100
Tegra SoCs	AGX Orin; Orin NX; Orin Nano	—N/a	—N/a	—N/a	—N/a	—N/a	—N/a

== See also ==
- List of eponyms of Nvidia GPU microarchitectures
- List of Nvidia graphics processing units
- Nvidia NVENC
- Nvidia NVDEC
