= Ada Lovelace (microarchitecture) =

GPU microarchitecture by Nvidia

- Launched: October 12, 2022; 3 years ago
- Designed by: Nvidia
- Manufactured by: TSMC
- Fabrication process: TSMC 4N
- Codename: AD10x

Product Series
- Desktop: GeForce RTX 40 series
- Professional/workstation: RTX Ada Generation
- Server/datacenter: Tesla Ada (L4x)

Specifications
- Clock rate: 735 MHz to 2640 MHz
- L1 cache: 128 KB (per SM)
- L2 cache: 32 MB to 96 MB
- Memory support: GDDR6; GDDR6X
- Memory clock rate: 21-23 Gbit/s
- PCIe support: PCIe 4.0

Supported Graphics APIs
- DirectX: DirectX 12 Ultimate (Feature Level 12_2)
- Direct3D: Direct3D 12
- Shader Model: Shader Model 6.8
- OpenGL: OpenGL 4.6
- CUDA: Compute Capability 8.9
- Vulkan: Vulkan 1.4

Supported Compute APIs
- OpenCL: OpenCL 3.0
- CUDA: CUDA Toolkit 11.6
- DirectCompute: Yes

Media Engine
- Encode codecs: H.264; H.265; AV1
- Decode codecs: H.264; H.265; AV1
- Color bit-depth: 8-bit; 10-bit
- Encoder supported: NVENC
- Display outputs: DisplayPort 1.4a; HDMI 2.1

History
- Predecessor: Ampere
- Variant: Hopper (datacenter)
- Successor: Blackwell

Support status
- Supported

Ada Lovelace, also referred to simply as Lovelace, is a graphics processing unit (GPU) microarchitecture developed by Nvidia as the successor to the Ampere architecture, officially announced on September 20, 2022. It is named after the 19th century English mathematician Ada Lovelace, one of the first computer programmers. Nvidia announced the architecture along with the GeForce RTX 40 series consumer GPUs and the RTX 6000 Ada Generation workstation graphics card. The Lovelace architecture is fabricated on TSMC's custom 4N process which offers increased efficiency over the previous Samsung 8 nm and TSMC N7 processes used by Nvidia for its previous-generation Ampere architecture.

== Background ==
The Ada Lovelace architecture follows on from the Ampere architecture that was released in 2020. The Ada Lovelace architecture was announced by Nvidia CEO Jensen Huang during a GTC 2022 keynote on September 20, 2022, with the architecture powering Nvidia's GPUs for gaming, workstations and datacenters.

== Architectural details ==
Architectural improvements of the Ada Lovelace architecture include the following:

- CUDA Compute Capability 8.9
- TSMC 4N process (custom designed for Nvidia) - not to be confused with TSMC's regular N4 node
- 4th-generation Tensor Cores with FP8, FP16, bfloat16, TensorFloat-32 (TF32) and sparsity acceleration
- 3rd-generation Ray Tracing Cores, plus concurrent ray tracing and shading and compute
- Shader Execution Reordering (SER)
- Nvidia video encoder/decoder (NVENC/NVDEC) with 8K 10-bit 60FPS AV1 fixed function hardware encoding
- No NVLink support

=== Streaming multiprocessors (SMs) ===
==== CUDA cores ====
128 CUDA cores are included in each SM.

==== RT cores ====
Ada Lovelace features third-generation RT cores. The RTX 4090 features 128 RT cores compared to the 84 in the previous generation RTX 3090 Ti. These 128 RT cores can provide up to 191 TFLOPS of compute with 1.49 TFLOPS per RT core. A new stage in the ray tracing pipeline called Shader Execution Reordering (SER) is added in the Lovelace architecture which Nvidia claims provides a 2x performance improvement in ray tracing workloads.

==== Tensor cores ====
Lovelace's new fourth-generation Tensor cores enable the AI technology used in DLSS 3's frame generation techniques. Much like Ampere, each SM contains 4 Tensor cores but Lovelace contains a greater number of Tensor cores overall given its increased number of SMs.

=== Clock speeds ===
There is a significant increase in clock speeds with the Ada Lovelace architecture with the RTX 4090's base clock speed being higher than the boost clock speed of the RTX 3090 Ti.

		RTX 2080 Ti	RTX 3090 Ti	RTX 4090
Architecture		Turing	Ampere	Ada Lovelace
Clock Speed	Base	1350 MHz	1560 MHz	2235 MHz
Clock Speed	Boost	1635 MHz	1860 MHz	2520 MHz

=== Cache and memory subsystem ===
	RTX 2080 Ti	RTX 3090 Ti	RTX 4090
Architecture	Turing	Ampere	Ada Lovelace
L1 Data Cache	6.375 MB (96 KB per SM)	10.5 MB (128 KB per SM)	16 MB (128 KB per SM)
L2 Cache	5.5 MB	6 MB	72 MB

The last enabled AD102 Lovelace die features 96 MB of L2 cache, a 16x increase from the 6 MB in the Ampere-based GA102 die. The GPU having quick access to a high amount of L2 cache benefits complex operations like ray tracing compared to the GPU seeking data from the GDDR video memory which is slower. Relying less on accessing memory for storing important and frequently accessed data means that a narrower memory bus width can be used in tandem with a large L2 cache.

Each memory controller uses a 32-bit connection with up to 12 controllers present for a combined memory bus width of 384-bit. The Lovelace architecture can use either GDDR6 or GDDR6X memory. GDDR6X memory features on the desktop GeForce RTX 40 series while the more energy-efficient GDDR6 memory is used on its corresponding mobile versions and on RTX A6000 workstation GPUs.

=== Power efficiency and process node ===
The Ada Lovelace architecture is able to use lower voltages compared to its predecessor. Nvidia claims a 2x performance increase for the RTX 4090 at the same 450W used by the previous generation flagship RTX 3090 Ti.

Increased power efficiency can be attributed in part to the smaller fabrication node used by the Lovelace architecture. The Ada Lovelace architecture is fabricated on TSMC's cutting-edge 4N process, a custom designed process node for Nvidia. The previous generation Ampere architecture used Samsung's 8nm-based 8N process node from 2018, which was two years old by the time of Ampere's launch. The AD102 die with its 76.3 billion transistors has a transistor density of 125.5 million per mm^{2}, a 178% increase in density from GA102's 45.1 million per mm^{2}.

=== Media engine ===
The Lovelace architecture utilizes the new 8th generation Nvidia NVENC video encoder and the 5th generation NVDEC video decoder introduced by Ampere returns.

NVENC AV1 hardware encoding with support for up to 8K resolution at 60FPS in 10-bit color is added, enabling higher video fidelity at lower bit rates compared to the H.264 and H.265 codecs. Nvidia claims that its NVENC AV1 encoder featured in the Lovelace architecture is 40% more efficient than the H.264 encoder in the Ampere architecture.

The Lovelace architecture received criticism for not supporting the DisplayPort 2.0 connection that supports higher display data bandwidth and instead uses the older DisplayPort 1.4a which is limited to a peak bandwidth of 32 Gbit/s. As a result, Lovelace GPUs would be limited by DisplayPort 1.4a's supported refresh rates despite the GPU's performance being able to reach higher frame rates. Intel's Arc GPUs that also released in October 2022 included DisplayPort 2.0. AMD's competing RDNA 3 architecture released just two months after Lovelace included DisplayPort 2.1.

== Ada Lovelace dies ==
Die	AD102	AD103	AD104	AD106	AD107
Die size	609 mm^{2}	379 mm^{2}	294 mm^{2}	188 mm^{2}	159 mm^{2}
Transistors	76.3B	45.9B	35.8B	22.9B	18.9B
Transistor density	125.3 MTr/mm^{2}	121.1 MTr/mm^{2}	121.8 MTr/mm^{2}	121.8 MTr/mm^{2}	118.9 MTr/mm^{2}
Graphics processing clusters	12	7	5	3	2
Streaming multiprocessors	144	80	60	36	24
CUDA cores	18432	10240	7680	4608	3072
Texture mapping units	576	320	240	144	96
Render output units	192	112	80	48	32
Tensor cores	576	320	240	144	96
RT cores	144	80	60	36	24
L1 cache	18 MB	10 MB	7.5 MB	4.5 MB	3 MB
L1 cache	128 KB per SM				
L2 cache	96 MB	64 MB	48 MB	32 MB	

== Ada Lovelace-based products ==
=== Consumer ===
==== Desktop ====
- GeForce 40 series
  - GeForce RTX 4060 (AD107)
  - GeForce RTX 4060 Ti (AD106)
  - GeForce RTX 4070 (AD104)
  - GeForce RTX 4070 SUPER (AD104)
  - GeForce RTX 4070 Ti (AD104)
  - GeForce RTX 4070 Ti SUPER (AD103)
  - GeForce RTX 4080 (AD103)
  - GeForce RTX 4080 SUPER (AD103)
  - GeForce RTX 4090 D (AD102)
  - GeForce RTX 4090 (AD102)

==== Mobile ====
- GeForce 40 series
  - GeForce RTX 4050 Laptop (AD107)
  - GeForce RTX 4060 Laptop (AD107)
  - GeForce RTX 4070 Laptop (AD106)
  - GeForce RTX 4080 Laptop (AD104)
  - GeForce RTX 4090 Laptop (AD103)

=== Professional ===
==== Desktop workstation ====
- Nvidia Workstation GPUs (formerly Quadro)
  - Nvidia RTX 2000 Ada Generation (AD107)
  - Nvidia RTX 4000 Ada Generation (AD104)
  - Nvidia RTX 4000 SFF Ada Generation (AD104)
  - Nvidia RTX 4500 Ada Generation (AD104)
  - Nvidia RTX 5000 Ada Generation (AD102)
  - Nvidia RTX 5880 Ada Generation (AD102)
  - Nvidia RTX 6000 Ada Generation (AD102)

==== Mobile workstation ====
- Nvidia Workstation GPUs (formerly Quadro)
  - Nvidia RTX 500 Ada Generation Laptop (AD107)
  - Nvidia RTX 1000 Ada Generation Laptop (AD107)
  - Nvidia RTX 2000 Ada Generation Laptop (AD107)
  - Nvidia RTX 3000 Ada Generation Laptop (AD106)
  - Nvidia RTX 3500 Ada Generation Laptop (AD104)
  - Nvidia RTX 4000 Ada Generation Laptop (AD104)
  - Nvidia RTX 5000 Ada Generation Laptop (AD103)

=== Datacenter ===
- Nvidia Data Center GPUs (formerly Tesla)
  - Nvidia L4 (AD104)
  - Nvidia L40 (AD102)
  - Nvidia L40G (AD102)
  - Nvidia L40CNX (AD102)

Products using Ada Lovelace (per die)
Type	AD107	AD106	AD104	AD103	AD102
GeForce 40 Series (Desktop)	GeForce RTX 4060	GeForce RTX 4060 Ti	GeForce RTX 4070; GeForce RTX 4070 SUPER; GeForce RTX 4070 Ti	GeForce RTX 4070 Ti Super; GeForce RTX 4080; GeForce RTX 4080 Super	GeForce RTX 4090 D GeForce RTX 4090
GeForce 40 Series (Mobile)	GeForce RTX 4050; GeForce RTX 4060	GeForce RTX 4070	GeForce RTX 4080	GeForce RTX 4090	—N/a
Nvidia Workstation GPUs (Desktop)	RTX 2000 Ada Generation	—N/a	RTX 4000 Ada Generation; RTX 4000 SFF Ada Generation; RTX 4500 Ada Generation	—N/a	RTX 5000 Ada Generation; RTX 5880 Ada Generation; RTX 6000 Ada Generation
Nvidia Workstation GPUs (Mobile)	RTX 500 Ada Generation; RTX 1000 Ada Generation; RTX 2000 Ada Generation	RTX 3000 Ada Generation	RTX 3500 Ada Generation; RTX 4000 Ada Generation	RTX 5000 Ada Generation	—N/a
Nvidia Data Center GPUs		—N/a	Nvidia L4	—N/a	Nvidia L40; Nvidia L40G; Nvidia L40CNX

== See also ==
- List of eponyms of Nvidia GPU microarchitectures
