= GeForce 600 series =

Series of GPUs by Nvidia

- Release date: March 22, 2012; 14 years ago
- Codename: GK10x
- Architecture: Fermi; Kepler
- Models: GeForce series: GeForce GT series; GeForce GTX series
- Transistors: 292M 40 nm (GF119): 585M 40 nm (GF108); 1.170B 40 nm (GF116); 1.950B 40 nm (GF114); 1.270B 28 nm (GK107); 1.020B 28 nm (GK208); 2.540B 28 nm (GK106); 3.540B 28 nm (GK104)

Cards
- Entry-level: 605; GT 610; GT 620; GT 625; GT 630; GT 635; GT 640; GT 645; GTX 645
- Mid-range: GTX 650; GTX 650 Ti; GTX 650 Ti BOOST; GTX 660
- High-end: GTX 660 Ti; GTX 670; GTX 680
- Enthusiast: GTX 690

API support
- OpenCL: OpenCL 3.0 (Note: In OpenCL 3.0, OpenCL 1.2 functionality has become a mandatory baseline, while all OpenCL 2.x and OpenCL 3.0 features were made optional.)
- OpenGL: OpenGL 4.6
- Vulkan: Vulkan 1.2; SPIR-V
- DirectX: Direct3D 12.0 (feature level 11_0) Shader Model 6.5

History
- Predecessor: GeForce 500 series
- Successor: GeForce 800M series; GeForce 700 series

Support status
- Unsupported

The GeForce 600 series is a series of graphics processing units developed by Nvidia, first released in 2012. It served as the introduction of the Kepler architecture. It is succeeded by the GeForce 700 series.

== Overview ==
Where the goal of the previous architecture, Fermi, was to increase raw performance (particularly for compute and tessellation), Nvidia's goal with the Kepler architecture was to increase performance per watt, while still striving for overall performance increases. The primary way Nvidia achieved this goal was through the use of a unified clock. By abandoning the shader clock found in their previous GPU designs, efficiency is increased, even though it requires more cores to achieve similar levels of performance. This is not only because the cores are more power efficient (two Kepler cores using about 90% of the power of one Fermi core, according to Nvidia's numbers), but also because the reduction in clock speed delivers a 50% reduction in power consumption in that area.

Kepler also introduced a new form of texture handling known as bindless textures. Previously, textures needed to be bound by the CPU to a particular slot in a fixed-size table before the GPU could reference them. This led to two limitations: one was that because the table was fixed in size, there could only be as many textures in use at one time as could fit in this table (128). The second was that the CPU was doing unnecessary work: it had to load each texture, and also bind each texture loaded in memory to a slot in the binding table. With bindless textures, both limitations are removed. The GPU can access any texture loaded into memory, increasing the number of available textures and removing the performance penalty of binding.

Finally, with Kepler, Nvidia was able to increase the memory clock to 6 GHz. To accomplish this, Nvidia needed to design an entirely new memory controller and bus. While still shy of the theoretical 7 GHz limitation of GDDR5, this is well above the 4 GHz speed of the memory controller for Fermi.

Kepler is named after the German mathematician, astronomer, and astrologer Johannes Kepler.

== Architecture ==
The GeForce 600 series contains products from both the older Fermi and newer Kepler generations of Nvidia GPUs. Kepler based members of the 600 series add the following standard features to the GeForce family:

- PCI Express 3.0 interface
- DisplayPort 1.2
- HDMI 1.4a 4K x 2K video output
- Purevideo VP5 hardware video acceleration (up to 4K x 2K H.264 decode)
- Hardware H.264 encoding acceleration block (NVENC)
- Support for up to 4 independent 2D displays, or 3 stereoscopic/3D displays (NV Surround)
- Next Generation Streaming Multiprocessor (SMX)
- A New Instruction Scheduler
- Bindless Textures
- CUDA Compute Capability 3.0
- GPU Boost
- TXAA
- Manufactured by TSMC on a 28 nm process

=== Streaming Multiprocessor Architecture (SMX) ===
The Kepler architecture employs a new Streaming Multiprocessor Architecture called SMX. The SMX are the key method for Kepler's power efficiency as the whole GPU uses a single "Core Clock" rather than the double-pump "Shader Clock". The SMX usage of a single unified clock increases the GPU power efficiency due to the fact that two Kepler CUDA Cores consume 90% power of one Fermi CUDA Core. Consequently, the SMX needs additional processing units to execute a whole warp per cycle. Kepler also needed to increase raw GPU performance as to remain competitive. As a result, it doubled the CUDA Cores from 16 to 32 per CUDA array, 3 CUDA Cores Array to 6 CUDA Cores Array, 1 load/store and 1 SFU group to 2 load/store and 2 SFU group. The GPU processing resources are also double. From 2 warp schedulers to 4 warp schedulers, 4 dispatch unit became 8 and the register file doubled to 64K entries as to increase performance. With the doubling of GPU processing units and resources increasing the usage of die spaces, The capability of the PolyMorph Engine aren't double but enhanced, making it capable of spurring out a polygon in 2 cycles instead of 4. With Kepler, Nvidia not only worked on power efficiency but also on area efficiency. Therefore, Nvidia opted to use eight dedicated FP64 CUDA cores in a SMX as to save die space, while still offering FP64 capabilities since all Kepler CUDA cores are not FP64 capable. With the improvement Nvidia made on Kepler, the results include an increase in GPU graphic performance while downplaying FP64 performance.

=== A new instruction scheduler ===
Additional die areas are acquired by replacing the complex hardware scheduler with a simple software scheduler. With software scheduling, warps scheduling was moved to Nvidia's compiler and as the GPU math pipeline now has a fixed latency, it now include the utilization of instruction-level parallelism and superscalar execution in addition to thread-level parallelism. As instructions are statically scheduled, scheduling inside a warp becomes redundant since the latency of the math pipeline is already known. This resulted an increase in die area space and power efficiency.

=== GPU Boost ===
GPU Boost is a new feature which is roughly analogous to turbo boosting of a CPU. The GPU is always guaranteed to run at a minimum clock speed, referred to as the "base clock". This clock speed is set to the level which will ensure that the GPU stays within TDP specifications, even at maximum loads. When loads are lower, however, there is room for the clock speed to be increased without exceeding the TDP. In these scenarios, GPU Boost will gradually increase the clock speed in steps, until the GPU reaches a predefined power target (which is 170W by default). By taking this approach, the GPU will ramp its clock up or down dynamically, so that it is providing the maximum amount of speed possible while remaining within TDP specifications.

The power target, as well as the size of the clock increase steps that the GPU will take, are both adjustable via third-party utilities and provide a means of overclocking Kepler-based cards.

=== Microsoft DirectX support ===
Both Fermi and Kepler based cards support Direct3D 11, both also support Direct3D 12, though not all features provided by the API.

=== TXAA ===
Exclusive to Kepler GPUs, TXAA is a new anti-aliasing method from Nvidia that is designed for direct implementation into game engines. TXAA is based on the MSAA technique and custom resolve filters. Its design addresses a key problem in games known as shimmering or temporal aliasing; TXAA resolves that by smoothing out the scene in motion, making sure that any in-game scene is being cleared of any aliasing and shimmering.

=== NVENC ===
NVENC is Nvidia's SIP block that performs video encoding, in a way similar to Intel's Quick Sync Video and AMD's VCE. NVENC is a power-efficient fixed-function pipeline that is able to take codecs, decode, preprocess, and encode H.264-based content. NVENC specification input formats are limited to H.264 output. But still, NVENC, through its limited format, can perform encoding in resolutions up to 4096×4096.

Like Intel's Quick Sync, NVENC is currently exposed through a proprietary API, though Nvidia does have plans to provide NVENC usage through CUDA.

=== New driver features ===
In the R300 drivers, released alongside the GTX 680, Nvidia introduced a new feature called Adaptive VSync. This feature is intended to combat the limitation of v-sync that, when the framerate drops below 60 FPS, there is stuttering as the v-sync rate is reduced to 30 FPS, then down to further factors of 60 if needed. However, when the framerate is below 60 FPS, there is no need for v-sync as the monitor will be able to display the frames as they are ready. To address this issue (while still maintaining the advantages of v-sync with respect to screen tearing), Adaptive VSync can be turned on in the driver control panel. It will enable VSync if the framerate is at or above 60 FPS, while disabling it if the framerate lowers. Nvidia claims that this will result in a smoother overall display.

While the feature debuted alongside the GTX 680, this feature is available to users of older Nvidia cards who install the updated drivers.

Dynamic Super Resolution (DSR) was added to Fermi and Kepler GPUs with an October 2014 release of Nvidia drivers. This feature aims at increasing the quality of displayed picture, by rendering the scenery at a higher and more detailed resolution (upscaling), and scaling it down to match the monitor's native resolution (downsampling). Such feature is similar to AMD's Virtual Super Resolution (VSR).

== History ==
In September 2010, Nvidia first announced Kepler.

In early 2012, details of the first members of the 600 series parts emerged. These initial members were entry-level laptop GPUs sourced from the older Fermi architecture.

On March 22, 2012, Nvidia unveiled the 600 series GPU: the GTX 680 for desktop PCs and the GeForce GT 640M, GT 650M, and GTX 660M for notebook/laptop PCs.

On April 29, 2012, the GTX 690 was announced as the first dual-GPU Kepler product.

On May 10, 2012, the GTX 670 was officially announced.

On June 4, 2012, the GTX 680M was officially announced.

On August 16, 2012, the GTX 660 Ti was officially announced.

On September 13, 2012, the GTX 660 and GTX 650 were officially announced.

On October 9, 2012, the GTX 650 Ti was officially announced.

On March 26, 2013, the GTX 650 Ti BOOST was officially announced.

== Products ==
=== GeForce 600 (6xx) series ===
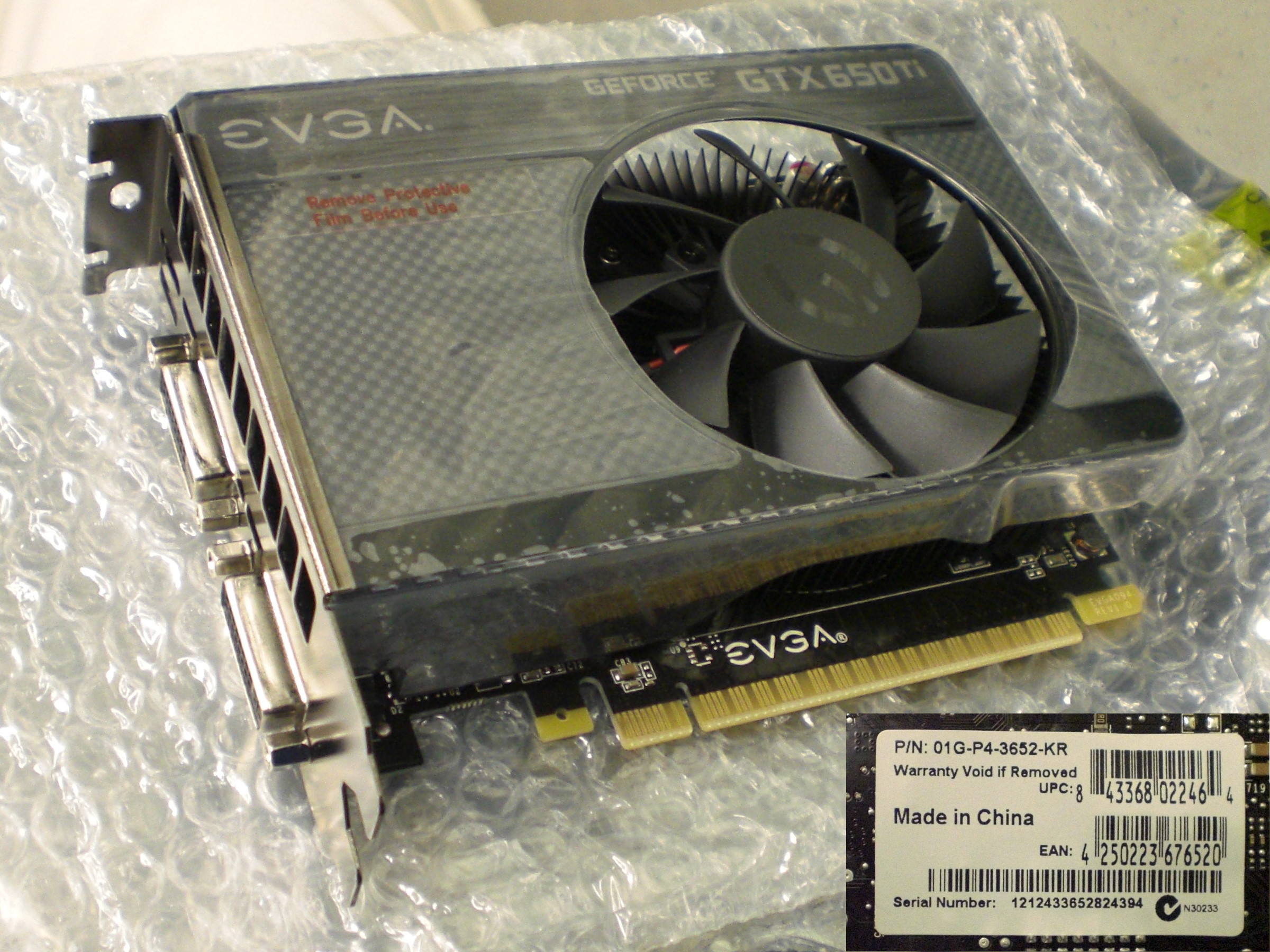
EVGA GeForce GTX 650 Ti

- ^{1} SPs – Shader Processors – Unified Shaders : Texture mapping units : Render output units
- ^{2} The GeForce 605 (OEM) card is a rebranded GeForce 510.
- ^{3} The GeForce GT 610 card is a rebranded GeForce GT 520. Last PCI version.
- ^{4} The GeForce GT 620 (OEM) card is a rebranded GeForce GT 520.
- ^{5} The GeForce GT 620 card is a rebranded GeForce GT 530.
- ^{6} This revision of GeForce GT 630 (DDR3) card is a rebranded GeForce GT 440 (DDR3).
- ^{7} The GeForce GT 630 (GDDR5) card is a rebranded GeForce GT 440 (GDDR5).
- ^{8} The GeForce GT 640 (OEM) card is a rebranded GeForce GT 545 (DDR3).
- ^{9} The GeForce GT 645 (OEM) card is a rebranded GeForce GTX 560 SE.

=== GeForce 600M (6xxM) series ===
The GeForce 600M series for notebooks architecture. The processing power is obtained by multiplying shader clock speed, the number of cores and how many instructions the cores are capable of performing per cycle.

- ^{1} Unified Shaders: Texture mapping units: Render output units

Model	Launch	Code Name	Fab (nm)	Bus interface	Core Configuration^{1}	Clock Speed			Fillrate		Memory				API Support (version)				Processing Power^{2} (GFLOPS)	TDP (Watts)	Notes
Model	Launch	Code Name	Fab (nm)	Bus interface	Core Configuration^{1}	Core (MHz)	Shader (MHz)	Memory (MT/s)	Pixel (GP/s)	Texture (GT/s)	Size (MiB)	Bandwidth (GB/s)	DRAM Type	Bus Width (bit)	DirectX	OpenGL	OpenCL	Vulkan	Processing Power^{2} (GFLOPS)	TDP (Watts)	Notes
GeForce 610M	Dec 2011	GF119 (N13M-GE)	40	PCIe 2.0 x16	48:8:4	450	900	1800	3.6	7.2	1024; 2048	14.4	DDR3	64	12.0 (11_0)	4.6	1.1	—N/a	142.08	12	OEM. Rebadged GT 520MX
GeForce GT 620M	Apr 2012	GF117 (N13M-GS)	28	PCIe 2.0 x16	96:16:4	625	1250	1800	2.5	10	1024; 2048	14.4; 28.8	DDR3	64; 128	12.0 (11_0)	4.6	1.1	—N/a	240	15	OEM. Die-Shrink GF108
GeForce GT 625M	October 2012	GF117 (N13M-GS)	28	PCIe 2.0 x16	96:16:4	625	1250	1800	2.5	10	1024; 2048	14.4	DDR3	64	12.0 (11_0)	4.6	1.1	—N/a	240	15	OEM. Die-Shrink GF108
GeForce GT 630M	Apr 2012	GF108 (N13P-GL); GF117	40; 28	PCIe 2.0 x16	96:16:4	660; 800	1320; 1600	1800; 4000	2.6; 3.2	10.7; 12.8	1024; 2048	28.8; 32.0	DDR3; GDDR5	128; 64	12.0 (11_0)	4.6	1.1	—N/a	258.0; 307.2	33	GF108: OEM. Rebadged GT 540M; GF117: OEM Die-Shrink GF108
GeForce GT 635M	Apr 2012	GF106 (N12E-GE2); GF116	40	PCIe 2.0 x16	144:24:24	675	1350	1800	16.2	16.2	2048; 1536	28.8; 43.2	DDR3	128; 192	12.0 (11_0)	4.6	1.1	—N/a	289.2; 388.8	35	GF106: OEM. Rebadged GT 555M; GF116: 144 Unified Shaders
GeForce GT 640M LE	March 22, 2012	GF108; GK107 (N13P-LP)	40; 28	PCIe 2.0 x16 PCIe 3.0 x16	96:16:4; 384:32:16	762; 500	1524; 500	3130; 1800	3; 8	12.2; 16	1024; 2048	50.2; 28.8	GDDR5; DDR3	128	12.0 (11_0)	4.6	1.1; 1.2	N/A ?	292.6; 384	32; 20	GF108: Fermi; GK107: Kepler architecture
GeForce GT 640M	March 22, 2012	GK107 (N13P-GS)	28	PCIe 3.0 x16	384:32:16	625	625	1800; 4000	10	20	1024; 2048	28.8; 64.0	DDR3; GDDR5	128	12.0 (11_0)	4.6	1.2	1.1	480	32	Kepler architecture
GeForce GT 645M	October 2012	GK107 (N13P-GS)	28	PCIe 3.0 x16	384:32:16	710	710	1800; 4000	11.36	22.72	1024; 2048	28.8; 64.0	DDR3; GDDR5	128	12.0 (11_0)	4.6	1.2	1.1	545	32	Kepler architecture
GeForce GT 650M	March 22, 2012	GK107 (N13P-GT)	28	PCIe 3.0 x16	384:32:16	835; 745; 900*	950; 835; 900*	1800; 4000; 5000*	15.2; 13.4; 14.4*	30.4; 26.7; 28.8*	1024; 2048 *	28.8; 64.0; 80.0*	DDR3; GDDR5; GDDR5*	128	12.0 (11_0)	4.6	1.2	1.1	729.6; 641.3; 691.2*	45	Kepler architecture
GeForce GTX 660M	March 22, 2012	GK107 (N13E-GE)	28	PCIe 3.0 x16	384:32:16	835	950	5000	15.2	30.4	2048	80.0	GDDR5	128	12.0 (11_0)	4.6	1.2	1.1	729.6	50	Kepler architecture
GeForce GTX 670M	April 2012	GF114 (N13E-GS1-LP)	40	PCIe 2.0 x16	336:56:24	598	1196	3000	14.35	33.5	1536; 3072	72.0	GDDR5	192	12.0 (11_0)	4.6	1.1	—N/a	803.6	75	OEM. Rebadged GTX 570M
GeForce GTX 670MX	October 2012	GK106 (N13E-GR)	28	PCIe 3.0 x16	960:80:24	600	600	2800	14.4	48.0	1536; 3072	67.2	GDDR5	192	12.0 (11_0)	4.6	1.2	1.1	1152	75	Kepler architecture
GeForce GTX 675M	April 2012	GF114 (N13E-GS1)	40	PCIe 2.0 x16	384:64:32	620	1240	3000	19.8	39.7	2048	96.0	GDDR5	256	12.0 (11_0)	4.6	1.1	?	952.3	100	OEM. Rebadged GTX 580M
GeForce GTX 675MX	October 2012	GK106 (N13E-GSR)	28	PCIe 3.0 x16	960:80:32	600	600	3600	19.2	48.0	4096	115.2	GDDR5	256	12.0 (11_0)	4.6	1.2	1.1	1152	100	Kepler architecture
GeForce GTX 680M	June 4, 2012	GK104 (N13E-GTX)	28	PCIe 3.0 x16	1344:112:32	720	720	3600	23	80.6	4096	115.2	GDDR5	256	12.0 (11_0)	4.6	1.2	1.1	1935.4	100	Kepler architecture
GeForce GTX 680MX	October 23, 2012	GK104	28	PCIe 3.0 x16	1536:128:32	720	720	5000	23	92.2	4096	160	GDDR5	256	12.0 (11_0)	4.6	1.2	1.1	2234.3	100+	Kepler architecture
Model	Launch	Code Name	Fab (nm)	Bus interface	Core Configuration^{1}	Clock Speed			Fillrate		Memory				API Support (version)				Processing Power^{2} (GFLOPS)	TDP (Watts)	Notes
Model	Launch	Code Name	Fab (nm)	Bus interface	Core Configuration^{1}	Core (MHz)	Shader (MHz)	Memory (MT/s)	Pixel (GP/s)	Texture (GT/s)	Size (MiB)	Bandwidth (GB/s)	DRAM Type	Bus Width (bit)	DirectX	OpenGL	OpenCL	Vulkan	Processing Power^{2} (GFLOPS)	TDP (Watts)	Notes

(*)-Apple MacBook Pro Retina 2012 with 512MB or 1024MB GDDR5 configuration.

== Chipset table ==
=== GeForce 600 (6xx) series ===
Model	Launch	Code name	Fab (nm)	Transistors (million)	Die size (mm^{2})	Bus interface	SM count	Core config (Note: Unified shaders: texture mapping units: render output units)	Clock rate					Fillrate		Memory configuration				Supported API version				Processing power (GFLOPS) (Note: To calculate the processing power see Kepler (microarchitecture)#Performance, or Fermi (microarchitecture)#Performance.)		TDP (Watts)	Release price (USD)
Model	Launch	Code name	Fab (nm)	Transistors (million)	Die size (mm^{2})	Bus interface	SM count	Core config	Core (MHz)	Average Boost (MHz)	Max Boost (MHz)	Shader (MHz)	Memory (MHz)	Pixel (GP/s)	Texture (GT/s)	Size (MB)	Bandwidth (GB/s)	DRAM type	Bus width (bit)	Vulkan (Note: Vulkan 1.2 is only supported on Kepler cards.)	Direct3D	OpenGL	OpenCL	Single precision	Double precision	TDP (Watts)	Release price (USD)
GeForce 605 (Note: The GeForce 605 (OEM) card is a rebranded GeForce 510.)	April 3, 2012	GF119	TSMC 40 nm	292	79	PCIe 2.0 x16	1	48:8:4	523	—N/a	—N/a	1046	898 (1796)	2.09	4.2	512 1024	14.4	DDR3	64	—N/a	12 (11_0)	4.6	1.2	100.4	Unknown	25	OEM
GeForce GT 610 (Note: The GeForce GT 610 card is a rebranded GeForce GT 520.)	May 15, 2012	GF119-300-A1	TSMC 40 nm	292	79	PCIe 2.0 x16, PCIe x1, PCI	1	48:8:4	810	—N/a	—N/a	1620	1000; 1800	3.24	6.5	512; 1024; 2048	8; 14.4	DDR3	64	—N/a	12 (11_0)	4.6	1.2	155.5	Unknown	29	Retail
GeForce GT 620 (Note: The GeForce GT 620 (OEM) card is a rebranded GeForce GT 520.)	April 3, 2012	GF119	TSMC 40 nm	292	79	PCIe 2.0 x16	1	48:8:4	810	—N/a	—N/a	1620	898 (1796)	3.24	6.5	512; 1024	14.4	DDR3	64	—N/a	12 (11_0)	4.6	1.2	155.5	Unknown	30	OEM
GeForce GT 620	May 15, 2012	GF108-100-KB-A1	TSMC 40 nm	585	116	PCIe 2.0 x16	2	96:16:4	700	—N/a	—N/a	1400	1000–1800	2.8	11.2	1024; 2048	8–14.4	DDR3	64	—N/a	12 (11_0)	4.6	1.2	268.8	Unknown	49	Retail
GeForce GT 625	February 19, 2013	GF119	TSMC 40 nm	292	79	PCIe 2.0 x16	1	48:8:4	810	—N/a	—N/a	1620	898 (1796)	3.24	6.5	512 1024	14.4	DDR3	64	—N/a	12 (11_0)	4.6	1.2	155.5	Unknown	30	OEM
GeForce GT 630 (Note: The GeForce GT 630 (DDR3, 128-bit, retail) card is a rebranded GeForce GT 430 (DDR3, 128-bit).) (Note: The GeForce GT 630 (GDDR5) card is a rebranded GeForce GT 440 (GDDR5).)	April 24, 2012	GK107	TSMC 28 nm	1300	118	PCIe 3.0 x16	1	192:16:16	875	—N/a	—N/a	875	891 (1782)	14	14	1024; 2048	28.5	DDR3	128	1.2	12 (11_0)	4.6	1.2	336	14	50	OEM
GeForce GT 630	May 15, 2012	GF108-400-A1	TSMC 40 nm	585	116	PCIe 2.0 x16	2	96:16:4	700	—N/a	—N/a	1620	1600–1800	2.8	11.2	1024; 2048; 4096	25.6–28.8	DDR3	128	—N/a	12 (11_0)	4.6	1.2	311	Unknown	49	Retail
GeForce GT 630	May 15, 2012	GF108	TSMC 40 nm	585	116	PCIe 2.0 x16	2	96:16:4	810	—N/a	—N/a	1620	800 (3200)	3.2	13	1024	51.2	GDDR5	128	—N/a	12 (11_0)	4.6	1.2	311	Unknown	65	Retail
GeForce GT 630	May 29, 2013	GK208-301-A1	TSMC 28 nm	1020	79	PCIe 2.0 x8	1	384:16:8	902	—N/a	—N/a	902	900 (1800)	7.22	14.44	1024; 2048	14.4	DDR3	64	1.2	12 (11_0)	4.6	1.2	692.7	Unknown	25	
GeForce GT 635	February 19, 2013	GK208	TSMC 28 nm	1020	79	PCIe 3.0 x8	1	384:16:8	967	—N/a	—N/a	967	1001 (2002)	7.74	15.5	1024; 2048	16	DDR3	64	1.2	12 (11_0)	4.6	1.2	742.7	Unknown	35	OEM
GeForce GT 640 (Note: The GeForce GT 640 (OEM) GF116 card is a rebranded GeForce GT 545 (DDR3).)	April 24, 2012	GF116	TSMC 40 nm	1170	238	PCIe 2.0 x16	3	144:24:24	720	—N/a	—N/a	1440	891 (1782)	17.3	17.3	1536; 3072	42.8	DDR3	192	—N/a	12 (11_0)	4.6	1.2	414.7	Unknown	75	OEM
GeForce GT 640	April 24, 2012	GK107	TSMC 28 nm	1300	118	PCIe 3.0 x16	2	384:32:16	797	—N/a	—N/a	797	891 (1782)	12.8	25.5	1024; 2048	28.5	DDR3	128	1.2	12 (11_0)	4.6	1.2	612.1	25.50	50	OEM
GeForce GT 640	June 5, 2012	GK107	TSMC 28 nm	1300	118	PCIe 3.0 x16	2	384:32:16	900	—N/a	—N/a	900	891 (1782)	14.4	28.8	2048; 4096	28.5	DDR3	128	1.2	12 (11_0)	4.6	1.2	691.2	28.8	65	100
GeForce GT 640	April 24, 2012	GK107	TSMC 28 nm	1300	118	PCIe 3.0 x16	2	384:32:16	950	—N/a	—N/a	950	1250 (5000)	15.2	30.4	1024; 2048	80	GDDR5	128	1.2	12 (11_0)	4.6	1.2	729.6	30.40	75	OEM
GeForce GT 640	May 29, 2013	GK208-400-A1	TSMC 28 nm	1020	79	PCIe 2.0 x8	2	384:16:8	1046	—N/a	—N/a	1046	1252 (5008)	8.37	16.7	1024	40.1	GDDR5	64	1.2	12 (11_0)	4.6	1.2	803.3	Unknown	49	
GeForce GT 645 (Note: The GeForce GT 645 (OEM) card is a rebranded GeForce GTX 560 SE.)	April 24, 2012	GF114-400-A1	TSMC 40 nm	1950	332	PCIe 2.0 x16	6	288:48:24	776	—N/a	—N/a	1552	1914	18.6	37.3	1024	91.9	GDDR5	192	—N/a	12 (11_0)	4.6	1.2	894	Unknown	140	OEM
GeForce GTX 645	April 22, 2013	GK106	TSMC 28 nm	2540	221	PCIe 3.0 x16	3	576:48:16	823.5	888.5	—N/a	823	1000 (4000)	14.16	39.5	1024	64	GDDR5	128	1.2	12 (11_0)	4.6	1.2	948.1	39.53	64	OEM
GeForce GTX 650	September 13, 2012	GK107-450-A2	TSMC 28 nm	1300	118	PCIe 3.0 x16	2	384:32:16	1058	—N/a	—N/a	1058	1250 (5000)	16.9	33.8	1024; 2048	80	GDDR5	128	1.2	12 (11_0)	4.6	1.2	812.54	33.86	64	110
GeForce GTX 650	November 27, 2013	GK-106-400-A1	TSMC 28 nm	2540	221	PCIe 3.0 x16	2	384:32:16	1058	—N/a	65	1058	1250 (5000)	16.9	33.8	1024; 2048	80	GDDR5	128	1.2	12 (11_0)	4.6	1.2	812.54	33.86	?	
GeForce GTX 650 Ti	October 9, 2012	GK106-220-A1	TSMC 28 nm	2540	221	PCIe 3.0 x16	4	768:64:16	928	—N/a	—N/a	928	1350 (5400)	14.8	59.4	1024; 2048	86.4	GDDR5	128	1.2	12 (11_0)	4.6	1.2	1425.41	59.39	110	150 (130)
GeForce GTX 650 Ti Boost	March 26, 2013	GK106-240-A1	TSMC 28 nm	2540	221	PCIe 3.0 x16	4	768:64:24	980	1032	—N/a	980	1502 (6008)	23.5	62.7	1024; 2048	144.2	GDDR5	192	1.2	12 (11_0)	4.6	1.2	1505.28	62.72	134	170 (150)
GeForce GTX 660	September 13, 2012	GK106-400-A1	TSMC 28 nm	2540	221	PCIe 3.0 x16	5	960:80:24	980	1032	1084	980	1502 (6008)	23.5	78.4	1536+512; 3072	96.1+48.1; 144.2	GDDR5	128+64; 192	1.2	12 (11_0)	4.6	1.2	1881.6	78.40	140	230 (180)
GeForce GTX 660	August 22, 2012	GK104-200-KD-A2	TSMC 28 nm	3540	294	PCIe 3.0 x16	6	1152:96:24; 1152:96:32	823.5	888.5	899	823	1450 (5800)	19.8	79	1536; 2048; 3072	134; 186	GDDR5	192; 256	1.2	12 (11_0)	4.6	1.2	2108.6	79.06	130	OEM
GeForce GTX 660 Ti	August 16, 2012	GK104-300-KD-A2	TSMC 28 nm	3540	294	PCIe 3.0 x16	7	1344:112:24	915	980	1058	915	1502 (6008)	22.0	102.5	2048	96.1+48.1; 144.2	GDDR5	128+64; 192	1.2	12 (11_0)	4.6	1.2	2459.52	102.48	150	300
GeForce GTX 670	May 10, 2012	GK104-325-A2	TSMC 28 nm	3540	294	PCIe 3.0 x16	7	1344:112:32	915	980	1084	915	1502 (6008)	29.3	102.5	2048; 4096	192.256	GDDR5	256	1.2	12 (11_0)	4.6	1.2	2459.52	102.48	170	400
GeForce GTX 680	March 22, 2012	GK104-400-A2	TSMC 28 nm	3540	294	PCIe 3.0 x16	8	1536:128:32	1006	1058	1110	1006	1502 (6008)	32.2	128.8	2048; 4096	192.256	GDDR5	256	1.2	12 (11_0)	4.6	1.2	3090.43	128.77	195	500
GeForce GTX 690	April 29, 2012	2x GK104-355-A2	TSMC 28 nm	2x 3540	2x 294	PCIe 3.0 x16	2x 8	2x 1536:128:32	915	1019	1058	915	1502 (6008)	2x 29.28	2x 117.12	2x 2048	2x 192.256	GDDR5	2x 256	1.2	12 (11_0)	4.6	1.2	2x 2810.88	2x 117.12	300	1000
Model	Launch	Code name	Fab (nm)	Transistors (million)	Die size (mm^{2})	Bus interface	SM count	Core config	Clock rate					Fillrate		Memory configuration				Supported API version				Processing power (GFLOPS)		TDP (Watts)	Release price (USD)
Model	Launch	Code name	Fab (nm)	Transistors (million)	Die size (mm^{2})	Bus interface	SM count	Core config	Core (MHz)	Average Boost (MHz)	Max Boost (MHz)	Shader (MHz)	Memory (MHz)	Pixel (GP/s)	Texture (GT/s)	Size (MB)	Bandwidth (GB/s)	DRAM type	Bus width (bit)	Vulkan	Direct3D	OpenGL	OpenCL	Single precision	Double precision	TDP (Watts)	Release price (USD)

== Support ==
Nvidia stopped releasing 32-bit drivers for 32-bit operating systems after the last Release 390 driver, 391.35, was released in March 2018.

Kepler notebook GPUs moved to legacy support in April 2019 and stopped receiving critical security updates in April 2020. Several notebook Geforce 6xxM GPUs were affected by this change, the remaining ones being low-end Fermi GPUs already out of support since January 2019.

Nvidia announced that after Release 470 drivers, it would transition driver support for the Windows 7 and Windows 8.1 operating systems to legacy status and continue to provide critical security updates for these operating systems through September 2024.

Nvidia announced that all remaining Kepler desktop GPUs would transition to legacy support from September 2021 onwards and be supported for critical security updates through September 2024. All remaining GeForce 6xx GPUs would be affected by this change.

== See also ==
- List of Nvidia graphics processing units
- GeForce 400 series
- GeForce 900 series
- GeForce 10 series
- Nvidia Quadro
- Nvidia Tesla
