= GLFW =

Software library

- Original author: Marcus Geelnard
- Developer: The GLFW Development Team
- Release: February 17, 2002; 24 years ago
- Stable release: 3.5.1 / July 31, 2026; 18 days ago
- Written in: C
- Operating system: Linux, macOS, Microsoft Windows, FreeBSD, NetBSD, OpenBSD
- Platform: Cross-platform
- Type: API
- License: zlib/libpng License
- Website: www.glfw.org
- Repository: github.com/glfw/glfw

GLFW (Graphics Library Framework) is a lightweight utility library for use with OpenGL, OpenGL ES and Vulkan. It provides programmers with the ability to create and manage windows as well as OpenGL and Vulkan contexts, as well as handle joystick, keyboard and mouse input.

== Software architecture ==
GLFW is a small C library that allows the creation and management of windows with OpenGL contexts, making it also possible to use multiple monitors and video modes. It provides access to input from the keyboard, mouse, and joysticks. The API provides a thin, multi-platform abstraction layer, primarily for applications whose sole graphics output is through the OpenGL API. While GLFW is designed for developing multi-platform OpenGL applications, it may also be used to avoid platform-specific APIs.

GLFW is used in programs that require a window, due to OpenGL not providing any mechanisms for creating the necessary contexts, managing windows, user input, timing, etc. There are several other libraries available for aiding OpenGL development. The most common ones are FreeGLUT (an Open Source implementation of GLUT) and SDL. However, FreeGLUT is mostly concerned with providing a stable clone of GLUT, while SDL is too large for some people and has never had OpenGL as its main focus. GLFW is predicated on the assumption that there is room for a lightweight, modern library for managing OpenGL contexts, windows, and input.

GLFW is not a user-interface library, platform-specific library, image-loading library or a threading library. Additionally, it cannot render independently or playback sound.

=== Programming language bindings ===
Although GLFW is written in C, bindings do exist to use the API with other programming languages including Ada, C#, Common Lisp, D, Delphi, Go, Harbour, Haskell, Java, Julia, Python, Rebol, Red, Ruby and Rust, among others.

=== Back-ends ===
GLFW version 3.2 has experimental support for Wayland through compile-time flags.

== See also ==
- GLUT – OpenGL's legacy windowing toolkit
- OpenGL Extension Wrangler Library
- Raylib
- Simple DirectMedia Layer
