= GeForce 900 series =

Series of GPUs by Nvidia

- Top: Logo of the series Bottom: A GeForce GTX 980 Ti released in 2015, the series' highest-end non-Titan model
- Release date: September 18, 2014; 12 years ago
- Codename: GF117; GK208; GM20x
- Architecture: Fermi; Kepler; Maxwell
- Models: GeForce series: GeForce GT series; GeForce GTX series
- Transistors: 2.94B (GM206): 5.2B (GM204); 8.0B (GM200)
- Fabrication process: TSMC 28 nm

Cards
- Mid-range: GeForce GTX 950; GeForce GTX 960
- High-end: GeForce GTX 970; GeForce GTX 980
- Enthusiast: GeForce GTX 980 Ti; Nvidia Titan X

API support
- Direct3D: Direct3D 12 (feature level 12_1); Shader Model 6.7
- OpenCL: OpenCL 3.0 (Note: In OpenCL 3.0, OpenCL 1.2 functionality has become a mandatory baseline, while all OpenCL 2.x and OpenCL 3.0 features were made optional.)
- OpenGL: OpenGL 4.6
- Vulkan: Vulkan 1.4; SPIR-V

History
- Predecessor: GeForce 800M series; GeForce 700 series
- Successor: GeForce 10 series

Support status
- Game-ready Driver support ended in November 2025. Security updates until October 2028.

The GeForce 900 series is a family of graphics processing units developed by Nvidia, succeeding the GeForce 700 series and serving as the high-end introduction to the Maxwell microarchitecture, named after James Clerk Maxwell. They were produced with TSMC's 28 nm process.

With Maxwell, the successor to Kepler, Nvidia expected three major outcomes: improved graphics capabilities, simplified programming, and better energy efficiency compared to the GeForce 700 series and GeForce 600 series.

Maxwell was announced in September 2010, with the first Maxwell-based GeForce consumer-class products released in early 2014.

== Architecture ==
=== First generation Maxwell (GM10x) ===
First generation Maxwell GM107/GM108 were released as GeForce GTX 745, GTX 750/750 Ti and GTX 850M/860M (GM107) and GT 830M/840M (GM108). These new chips provide few consumer-facing additional features; Nvidia instead focused on power efficiency. Nvidia increased the amount of L2 cache from 256 KiB on GK107 to 2 MiB on GM107, reducing the memory bandwidth needed. Accordingly, Nvidia cut the memory bus from 192 bit on GK106 to 128 bit on GM107, further saving power. Nvidia also changed the streaming multiprocessor design from that of Kepler (SMX), naming it SMM. The structure of the warp scheduler is inherited from Kepler, which allows each scheduler to issue up to two instructions that are independent from each other and are in order from the same warp. The layout of SMM units is partitioned so that each of the 4 warp schedulers in an SMM controls 1 set of 32 FP32 CUDA cores, 1 set of 8 load/store units, and 1 set of 8 special function units. This is in contrast to Kepler, where each SMX has 4 schedulers that schedule to a shared pool of 6 sets of 32 FP32 CUDA cores, 2 sets of 16 load/store units, and 2 sets of 16 special function units. These units are connected by a crossbar that uses power to allow the resources to be shared. This crossbar is removed in Maxwell. Texture units and FP64 CUDA cores are still shared. SMM allows for a finer-grain allocation of resources than SMX, saving power when the workload isn't optimal for shared resources. Nvidia claims a 128 CUDA core SMM has 86% of the performance of a 192 CUDA core SMX. Also, each Graphics Processing Cluster, or GPC, contains up to 4 SMX units in Kepler, and up to 5 SMM units in first generation Maxwell.

GM107 supports CUDA Compute Capability 5.0 compared to 3.5 on GK110/GK208 GPUs and 3.0 on GK10x GPUs. Dynamic Parallelism and HyperQ, two features in GK110/GK208 GPUs, are also supported across the entire Maxwell product line.

Maxwell provides native shared memory atomic operations for 32-bit integers and native shared memory 32-bit and 64-bit compare-and-swap (CAS), which can be used to implement other atomic functions.

While it was once thought that Maxwell used tile-based immediate mode rasterization, Nvidia corrected this at GDC 2017 saying Maxwell instead uses Tile Caching.

==== NVENC ====
Maxwell-based GPUs also contain the NVENC SIP block introduced with Kepler. Nvidia's video encoder, NVENC, is 1.5 to 2 times faster than on Kepler-based GPUs meaning it can encode video at 6 to 8 times playback speed.

==== PureVideo ====
Nvidia also claims an 8 to 10 times performance increase in PureVideo Feature Set E video decoding due to the video decoder cache paired with increases in memory efficiency. However, H.265 is not supported for full hardware decoding, relying on a mix of hardware and software decoding. When decoding video, a new low power state "GC5" is used on Maxwell GPUs to conserve power.

=== Second generation Maxwell (GM20x) ===
Second generation Maxwell introduced several new technologies: Dynamic Super Resolution, Third Generation Delta Color Compression, Multi-Pixel Programming Sampling, Nvidia VXGI (Real-Time-Voxel-Global Illumination), VR Direct, Multi-Projection Acceleration, and Multi-Frame Sampled Anti-Aliasing (MFAA) (however support for Coverage-Sampling Anti-Aliasing (CSAA) was removed). HDMI 2.0 support was also added.

Second generation Maxwell also changed the ROP to memory controller ratio from 8:1 to 16:1. However, some of the ROPs are generally idle in the GTX 970 because there are not enough enabled SMMs to give them work to do and therefore reduces its maximum fill rate.

Second generation upgraded NVENC which supports HEVC encoding and adds support for H.264 encoding resolutions at 1440p/60FPS & 4K/60FPS compared to NVENC on Maxwell first generation GM10x GPUs which only supported H.264 1080p/60FPS encoding. Maxwell GM206 GPU supports full fixed function HEVC hardware decoding.

=== Async compute support ===
While the Maxwell series was marketed as fully DirectX 12 compliant, Oxide Games, developer of Ashes of the Singularity, uncovered that Maxwell-based cards do not perform well when async compute is utilized.

It appears that while this core feature is in fact exposed by the driver, Nvidia partially implemented it through a driver-based shim, coming at a high performance cost. Unlike AMD's competing GCN-based graphics cards which include a full implementation of hardware-based asynchronous compute, Nvidia planned to rely on the driver to implement a software queue and a software distributor to forward asynchronous tasks to the hardware schedulers, capable of distributing the workload to the correct units. Asynchronous compute on Maxwell therefore requires that both a game and the GPU driver be specifically coded for asynchronous compute on Maxwell in order to enable this capability. The 3DMark Time Spy benchmark shows no noticeable performance difference between asynchronous compute being enabled or disabled. Asynchronous compute is disabled by the driver for Maxwell.

Oxide claims that this led to Nvidia pressuring them not to include the asynchronous compute feature in their benchmark at all, so that the 900 series would not be at a disadvantage against AMD's products which implement asynchronous compute in hardware.

Maxwell requires that the GPU be statically partitioned for asynchronous compute to allow tasks to run concurrently. Each partition is assigned to a hardware queue. If any of the queues that are assigned to a partition empty out or are unable to submit work for any reason (e.g. a task in the queue must be delayed until a hazard is resolved), the partition and all of the resources in that partition reserved for that queue will idle. Asynchronous compute therefore could easily hurt performance on Maxwell if it is not coded to work with Maxwell's static scheduler. Furthermore, graphics tasks saturate Nvidia GPUs much more easily than they do to AMD's GCN-based GPUs which are much more heavily weighted towards compute, so Nvidia GPUs have fewer scheduling holes that could be filled by asynchronous compute than AMD's. For these reasons, the driver forces a Maxwell GPU to place all tasks into one queue and execute each task in serial, and give each task the undivided resources of the GPU no matter whether or not each task can saturate the GPU or not.

== Products ==
=== GeForce 900 (9xx) series ===
Model	Launch	Code name	Process	Transistors (billion)	Die size (mm^{2})	Core config (Note: Main shader processors: texture mapping units: render output units (streaming multiprocessors))	Bus interface	L2 Cache (MB)	Clock Speeds			Memory				Fillrate (Note: Base clock, Boost clock)		Processing power (GFLOPS) (Note: To calculate the processing power see Maxwell (microarchitecture)#Performance.)		TDP (Watts)	SLI support	Release price (USD)
Model	Launch	Code name	Process	Transistors (billion)	Die size (mm^{2})	Core config	Bus interface	L2 Cache (MB)	Base (MHz)	Boost (MHz)	Memory (MT/s)	Size (GB)	Bandwidth (GB/s)	Bus type	Bus width (bit)	Pixel (GP/s) (Note: Pixel fillrate is calculated as the number of ROPs multiplied by the respective core clock speed.)	Texture (GT/s) (Note: Texture fillrate is calculated as the number of TMUs multiplied by the respective core clock speed.)	Single precision	Double precision	TDP (Watts)	SLI support	MSRP
GeForce GT 945A	February, 2016	GM108	TSMC; 28HP	Unknown	Unknown	512:24:8 (4)	PCIe 3.0 x8	?	1072	1176	1800	1 / 2	14.4	DDR3 / GDDR5	64	8.5; 9.4	25.7; 28.2	1,097.7; 1,204.2	34.3; 37.6	33	No	OEM
GeForce GTX 950	August 20, 2015	GM206-250	TSMC; 28HP	2.94	227	768:48:32 (6)	PCIe 3.0 x16	1	1024	1188	6600	2	105.7	GDDR5	128	32.7; 38.0	49.1; 57.0	1,572.8; 1,824.7	49.1; 57.0	90 (75 (Note: Some GTX950 cards were released without power connector powered only by PCIe slot. These had limited power consumption and TDP to 75W.))	2-way SLI	159
GeForce GTX 950 (OEM)	Unknown	GM206	TSMC; 28HP	2.94	227	1024:64:32 (8)	PCIe 3.0 x16	1	935	Unknown	5000	2	80.0	GDDR5	128	29.9	59.8	1,914.9,	59.8	Unknown	2-way SLI	OEM
GeForce GTX 960	January 22, 2015	GM206-300	TSMC; 28HP	2.94	227	1024:64:32 (8)	PCIe 3.0 x16	1	1127	1178	7000	2; 4 (Note: Some manufacturers produced 4 GB versions of GTX 960. These were often criticized as useless move, as titles that would use so much VRAM and actually gain advantage over 2 GB versions, would already run too slow on those resolutions and settings, as GTX960 didn't have enough compute power and memory bandwidth to handle it.)	112.1	GDDR5	128	36.0; 37.6	72.1; 75.3	2,308.0; 2,412.5	72.1; 75.3	120	2-way SLI	199
GeForce GTX 960 (OEM)	Unknown	GM204	TSMC; 28HP	5.2	398	1280:80:48 (10)	PCIe 3.0 x16	1	924	Unknown	5000	3	120.0	GDDR5	192	44.3	73.9	2,365.4,	73.9	Unknown	2-way SLI	OEM
GeForce GTX 970	September 18, 2014	GM204-200	TSMC; 28HP	5.2	398	1664:104:56 (13)	PCIe 3.0 x16	1.75	1050	1178	7000	3.5 + 0.5 (Note: For accessing its memory, the GTX 970 stripes data across 7 of its 8 32-bit physical memory lanes, at 196 GB/s. The last 1/8 of its memory (0.5 GB on a 4 GB card) is accessed on a non-interleaved solitary 32-bit connection at 28 GB/s, one seventh the speed of the rest of the memory space. Because this smaller memory pool uses the same connection as the 7th lane to the larger main pool, it contends with accesses to the larger block reducing the effective memory bandwidth not adding to it as an independent connection could.)	196.3 + 28.0	GDDR5	224 + 32	58.8; 65.9	109.2; 122.5	3,494.4; 3,920.3	109.2; 122.5	145	4-way SLI	329
GeForce GTX 980	September 18, 2014	GM204-400	TSMC; 28HP	5.2	398	2048:128:64 (16)	PCIe 3.0 x16	2	1126	1216	7000	4	224.3	GDDR5	256	72.0; 77.8	144.1; 155.6	4,612.0; 4,980.7	144.1; 155.6	165	4-way SLI	549
GeForce GTX 980 Ti	June 1, 2015	GM200-310	TSMC; 28HP	8	601	2816:176:96 (22)	PCIe 3.0 x16	3	1000	1075	7000	6	336.5	GDDR5	384	96.0; 103.2	176.0; 189.2	5,632.0; 6,054.4	176.0; 189.2	250	4-way SLI	649
GeForce GTX Titan X	March 17, 2015	GM200-400	TSMC; 28HP	8	601	3072:192:96 (24)	PCIe 3.0 x16	3	1000	1075	7000	12	336.5	GDDR5	384	96.0; 103.2	192.0; 206.4	6,144.0; 6,604.8	192.0; 206.4	250	4-way SLI	999

=== GeForce 900M (9xxM) series ===
Some implementations may use different specifications. 910M and 920M have two non-Maxwell variants: GF117 (Fermi) and GK208 (Kepler).

Model	Launch	Code name	Fab (nm)	Transistors (million)	Die size (mm^{2})	Bus interface	Core config (Note: Shader Processors: Texture mapping units: Render output units)	Clock speeds			Fillrate		Memory				API support (version)				Processing power (GFLOPS)		TDP (watts)	SLI support (Note: A maximum of 2 dual-GPU cards can be connected in tandem for a 4-way SLI configuration as dual-GPU cards feature on-board 2-way SLI.)
Model	Launch	Code name	Fab (nm)	Transistors (million)	Die size (mm^{2})	Bus interface	Core config	Base core clock (MHz)	Boost core clock (MHz)	Memory (MT/s)	Pixel (GP/s) (Note: Pixel fillrate is calculated as the lowest of three numbers: number of ROPs multiplied by the base core clock speed, number of rasterizers multiplied by the number of fragments they can generate per rasterizer multiplied by the base core clock speed, and the number of streaming multiprocessors multiplied by the number of fragments per clock that they can output multiplied by the base clock rate.)	Texture (GT/s) (Note: Texture fillrate is calculated as the number of TMUs multiplied by the base core clock speed.)	Size (MiB)	Bandwidth (GB/s)	Type	Bus width (bit)	DirectX	OpenGL	OpenCL	Vulkan	Single precision (Note: Single precision performance is calculated as 2 times the number of shaders multiplied by the base core clock speed.)	Double precision (Note: Double precision performance of the Maxwell chips' are 1/32 of single-precision performance.)	TDP (watts)	SLI support
GeForce 910M	Aug 18, 2015	GF117 (Note: Lacks hardware video encoder)	28	585	116	PCIe 3.0 x8	96:16:8	775	1550	1800	3.1	12.4	1024	14.4	GDDR3	64	12.0 (11_0)	4.6	1.1	—N/a	297.6	1/12 of SP	33	No
GeForce 910M	March 15, 2015	GK208	28	Unknown	87	PCIe 3.0 x8	384:16:8	575	575	1800	5.13	9.2	2048	14.4	GDDR3	64	12.0 (11_0)	4.6	1.2	1.1	441.6	18.4	33	No
GeForce 920M	March 13, 2015	GF117	28	585	116	PCIe 3.0 x8	96:16:8	775	1550	1800	3.1	12.4	1024	14.4	GDDR3	64	12.0 (11_0)	4.6	1.1	—N/a	297.6	1/12 of SP	33	No
GeForce 920M	March 13, 2015	GK208	28	Unknown	87	PCIe 3.0 x8	384:32:16	954	954	1800	7.6	30.5	2048	14.4	GDDR3	64	12.0 (11_0)	4.6	1.2	1.1	732.7	22.9	33	No
GeForce 920MX	March 2016	GM108 (Note: Lacks hardware video encoder and decoder)	28	1870	148	PCIe 3.0 x8	256:24:8	1072	1176	1800	8.58	25.7	2048	14.4	DDR3 GDDR5	64	12.0 (11_0)	4.6	1.2	1.1	549	1/32 of SP	16	No
GeForce 930M	March 13, 2015	GM108	28	1870	148	PCIe 3.0 x8	384:24:8	928	941	1800	7.4	22.3	2048	14.4	DDR3	64	12.0 (11_0)	4.6	1.2	1.1	712.7	22.3	33	No
GeForce 930MX	March 1, 2016	GM108	28	Unknown	Unknown	PCIe 3.0 x8	384:24:8	952	1020	2000	Unknown	Unknown	2048	Unknown	DDR3 GDDR5	64	12.0 (11_0)	4.6	Unknown	Unknown	Unknown	Unknown	Unknown	Unknown
GeForce 940M	March 13, 2015	GM107	28	1870	148	PCIe 3.0 x16	640:40:16	1029	1100	2002	16.5	41.2	2048	16 - 80.2	GDDR5 DDR3	128	12.0 (11_0)	4.6	1.2	1.1	1317	41.1	75	No
GeForce 940M	March 13, 2015	GM108	28	Unknown	Unknown	PCIe 3.0 x8	384:24:8	1029	1100	2002	8.2	24.7	2048	16 - 80.2	GDDR5 DDR3	64	12.0 (11_0)	4.6	1.2	1.1	790.3	24.7	33	No
GeForce 940MX	March 10, 2016	GM108	28	1870	148	PCIe 3.0 x8	384:24:8	1122	1242	2002	8.98	26.93	2048; 4096	16.02 (DDR3); 40.1 (GDDR5)	GDDR5 DDR3	64	12.0 (11_0)	4.6	1.2	1.1	861.7	Unknown	23	No
GeForce 945M	2015	GM107	28	1870	148	?	640:40:16	1029	1085	?	16.46	41.2	?	?	DDR3 GDDR5	128	12.0 (11_0)	4.6	1.2	1.1	1,317.1	?	75	?
GeForce 945M	2015	GM108	28	?	?	PCIe 3.0 x8	384:24:8	1122	1242	?	8.98	26.93	?	?	DDR3 GDDR5	64	12.0 (11_0)	4.6	1.2	1.1	861.7	?	23	?
GeForce GT 945A	March 13, 2015	GM108	28	Unknown	Unknown	PCIe 3.0 x8	384:24:8	1072	1176	1800	8.58	25.73	2048	14.4	DDR3	64	12.0 (11_0)	4.6	1.2	Unknown	Unknown	Unknown	33	Unknown
GeForce GTX 950M	March 13, 2015	GM107	28	1870	148	PCIe 3.0 x16	640:40:16	914	1085	5012	14.6	36.6	2048(GDDR5); 4096(DDR3)	80(GDDR5); 32(DDR3)	DDR3 GDDR5	128	12.0 (11_0)	4.6	1.2	1.1	1170	36.56	75	No
GeForce GTX 960M	March 13, 2015	GM107	28	1870	148	PCIe 3.0 x16	640:40:16	1029	1085	5012	16.5	41.2	2048; 4096	80	GDDR5	128	12.0 (11_0)	4.6	1.2	1.1	1317	41.16	65	No
GeForce GTX 965M	January 5, 2015	GM204	28	5200	398	PCIe 3.0 x16	1024:64:32	924	950	5000	30.2	60.4	2048; 4096	80	GDDR5	128	12.0 (12_1)	4.6	1.2	1.1	1945	60.78	60	Yes
GeForce GTX 970M	October 7, 2014	GM204	28	5200	398	PCIe 3.0 x16	1280:80:48	924	993	5012	37.0	73.9	3072; 6144	120	GDDR5	192	12.0 (12_1)	4.6	1.2	1.1	2365	73.9	75	Yes
GeForce GTX 980M	October 7, 2014	GM204	28	5200	398	PCIe 3.0 x16	1536:96:64	1038	1127	5012	49.8	99.6	4096; 8192	160	GDDR5	256	12.0 (12_1)	4.6	1.2	1.1	3189	99.6	100	Yes

== Advertising controversy ==
=== GTX 970 hardware specifications ===
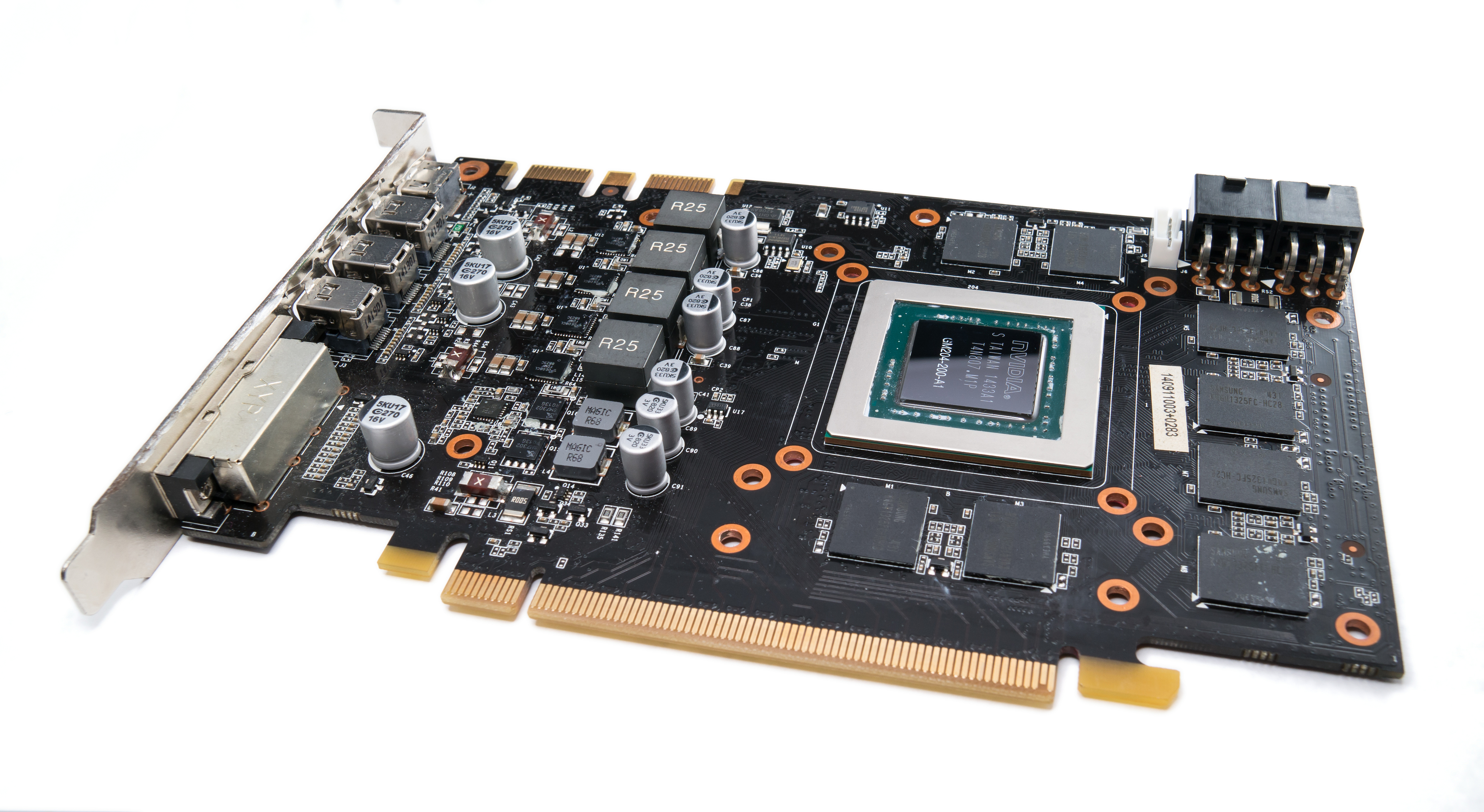
Nvidia GeForce GTX 970 PCB and die

Issues with the GeForce GTX 970's specifications were first brought up by users when they found out that the cards, while featuring 4 GB of memory, rarely accessed memory over the 3.5 GB boundary. Further testing and investigation eventually led to Nvidia issuing a statement that the card's initially announced specifications had been altered without notice before the card was made commercially available, and that the card took a performance hit once memory over the 3.5 GB limit were put into use.

The card's back-end hardware specifications, initially announced as being identical to those of the GeForce GTX 980, differed in the amount of L2 cache (1.75 MB versus 2 MB in the GeForce GTX 980) and the number of ROPs (56 versus 64 in the 980). Additionally, it was revealed that the card was designed to access its memory as a 3.5 GB section, plus a 0.5 GB one, access to the latter being 7 times slower than the first one. The company then went on to promise a specific driver modification in order to alleviate the performance issues produced by the cutbacks suffered by the card. However, Nvidia later clarified that the promise had been a miscommunication and there would be no specific driver update for the GTX 970. Nvidia claimed that it would assist customers who wanted refunds in obtaining them. On February 26, 2015, Nvidia CEO Jen-Hsun Huang went on record in Nvidia's official blog to apologize for the incident. In February 2015 a class-action lawsuit alleging false advertising was filed against Nvidia and Gigabyte Technology in the U.S. District Court for Northern California.

Nvidia revealed that it is able to disable individual units, each containing 256KB of L2 cache and 8 ROPs, without disabling whole memory controllers. This comes at the cost of dividing the memory bus into high speed and low speed segments that cannot be accessed at the same time unless one segment is reading while the other segment is writing because the L2/ROP unit managing both of the GDDR5 controllers shares the read return channel and the write data bus between the two GDDR5 controllers and itself. This is used in the GeForce GTX 970, which therefore can be described as having 3.5 GB in its high speed segment on a 224-bit bus and 0.5 GB in a low speed segment on a 32-bit bus.

On July 27, 2016, Nvidia agreed to a preliminary settlement of the U.S. class action lawsuit, offering a $30 refund on GTX 970 purchases. The agreed upon refund represents the portion of the cost of the storage and performance capabilities the consumers assumed they were obtaining when they purchased the card.

== Support ==
Driver 368.81 is the last driver to support Windows XP/Windows XP 64-bit.

32-bit drivers for 32-bit operating systems were discontinued after the release of driver 391.35 in March 2018.

Notebook GPUs based on the Kepler architecture moved to legacy support in April 2019 and stopped receiving critical security updates after April 2020. The Nvidia GeForce 910M and 920M from the 9xxM GPU family are affected by this change.

Nvidia announced that after the release of the 470 driver branch, it would transition driver support for the Windows 7 and Windows 8.1 operating systems to legacy status and continue to provide critical security updates for these operating systems through September 2024.

In December 2025, Nvidia discontinued Game Ready Driver support for the Maxwell, Pascal, and Volta architectures, which includes the GeForce 900 series. Security updates are scheduled to be continued until October 2028, as per Nvidia. On July 1, 2025, Nvidia announced that driver branch 580 will be the last to support these architectures.

== Gallery ==
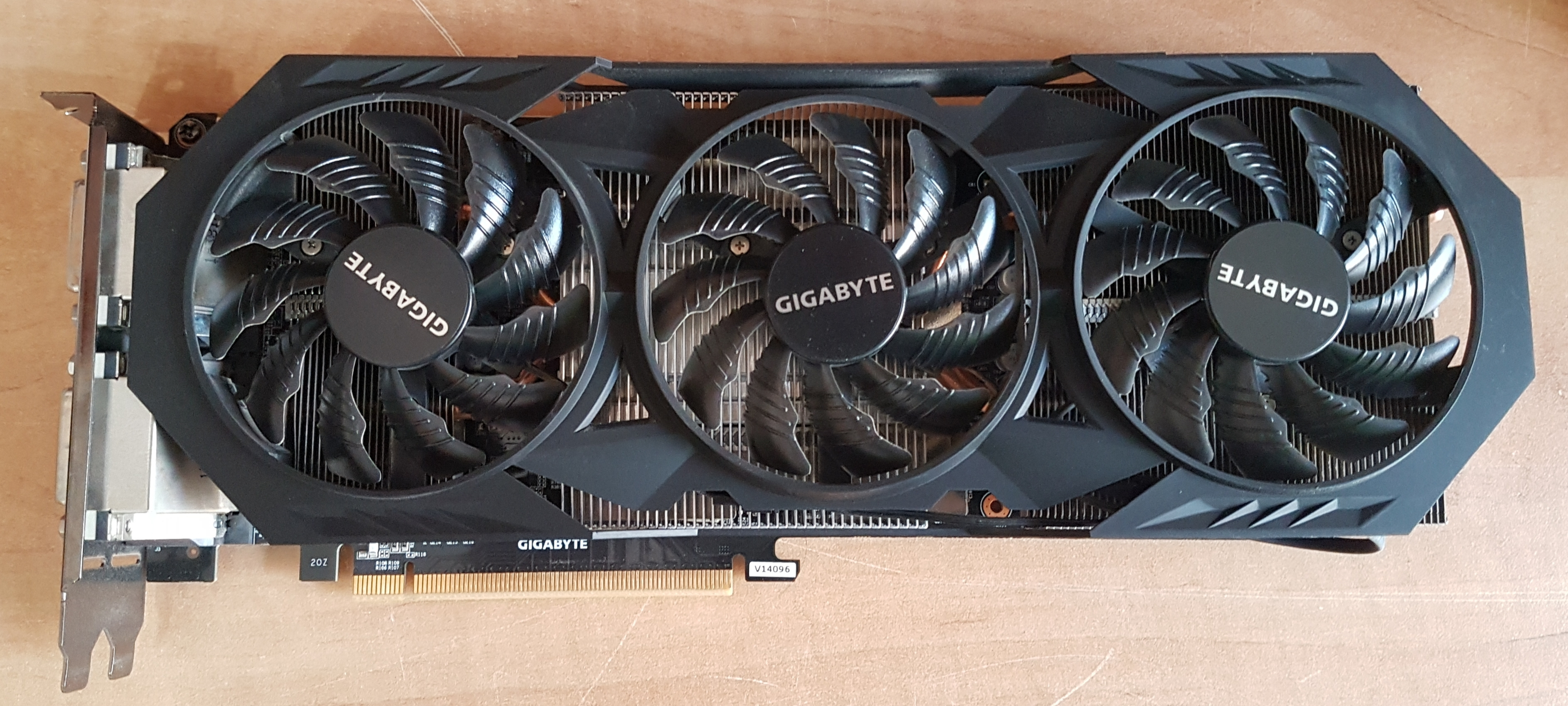
Nvidia GeForce GTX 970 'Windforce' edition. This particular model manufactured by Nvidia board-partner, Gigabyte.

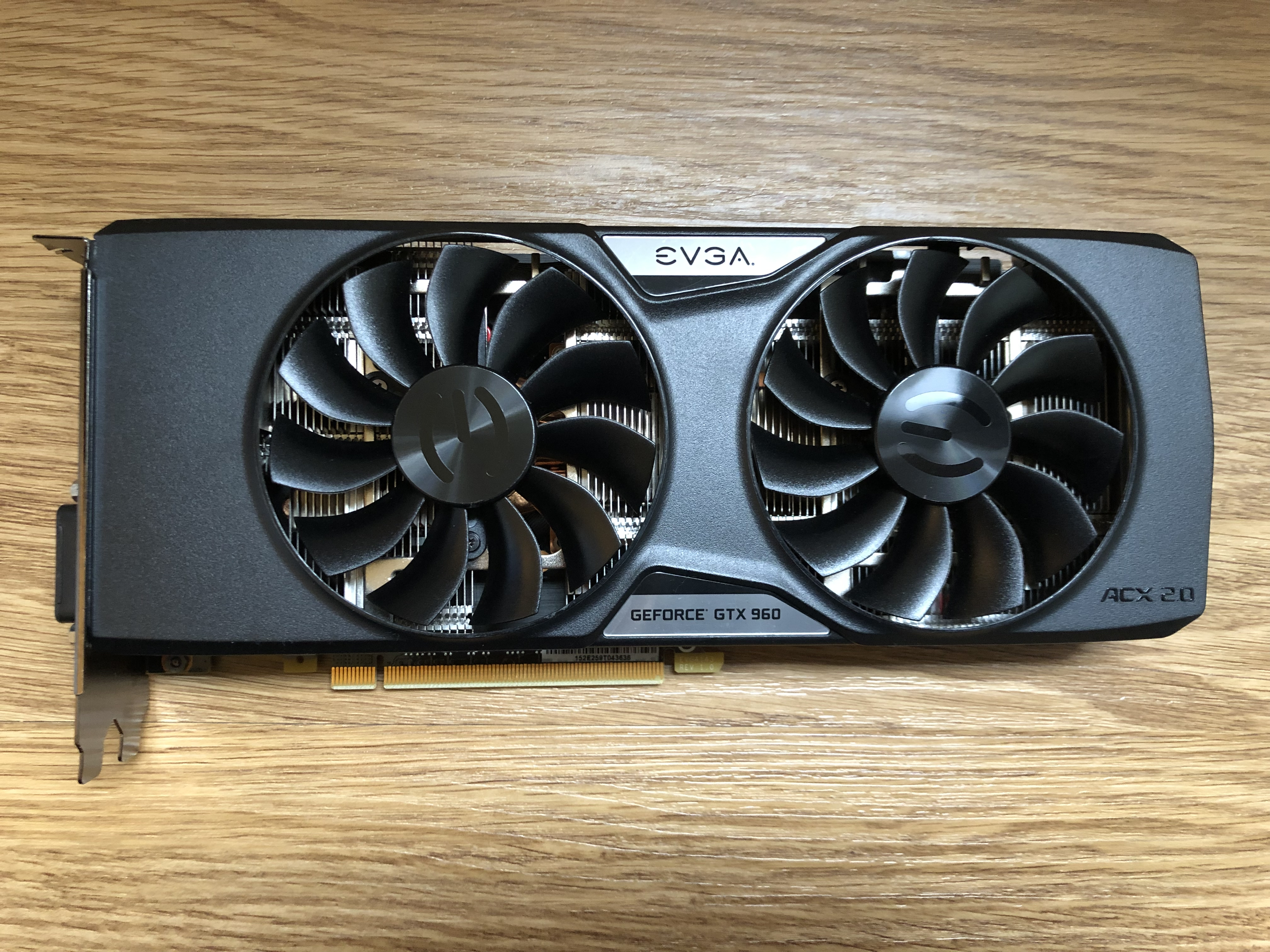
Nvidia GeForce GTX 960 'ACX 2.0' edition. This particular model manufactured by Nvidia board-partner, EVGA.

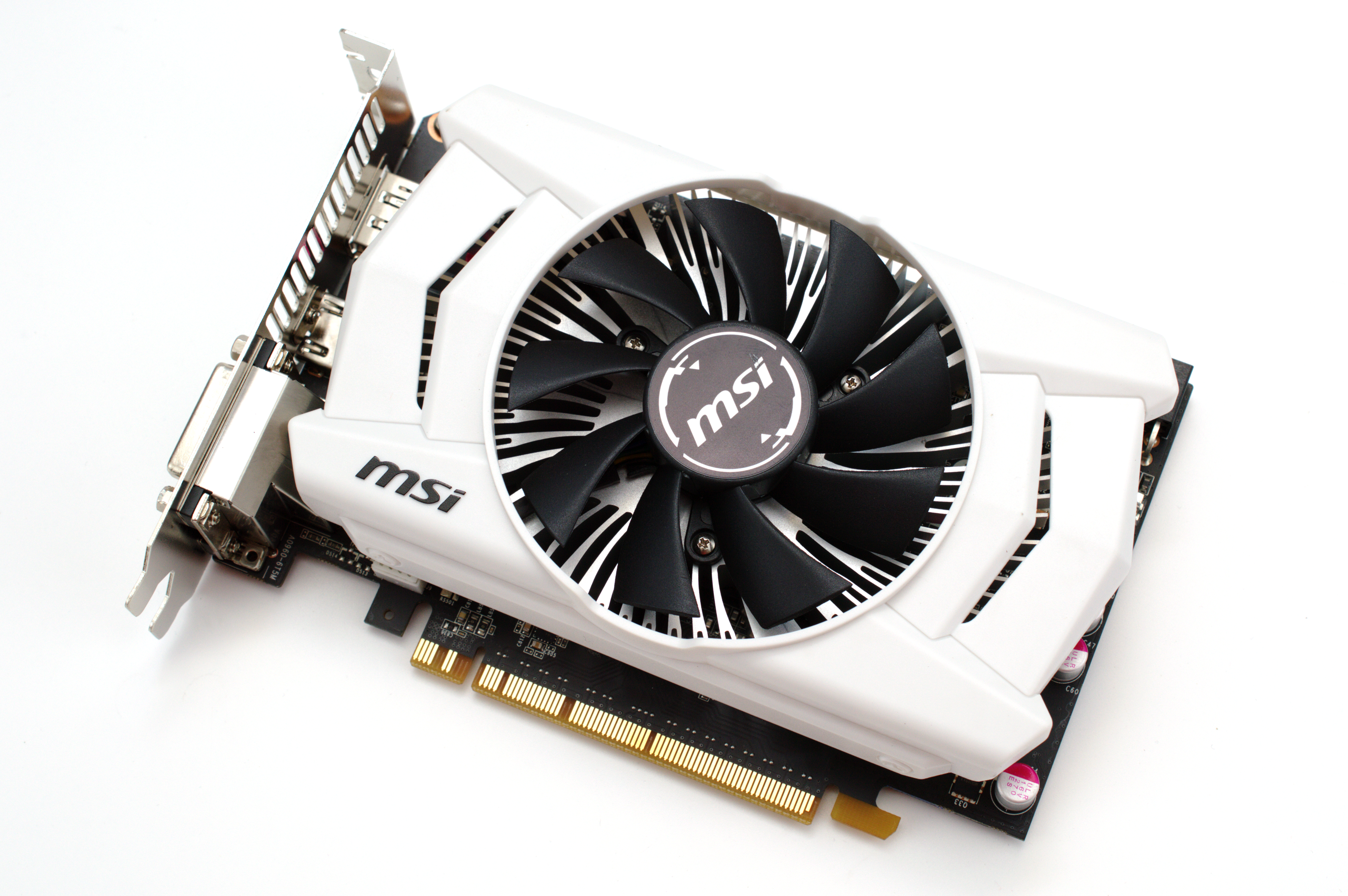
Nvidia GeForce GTX 950. This particular model manufactured by Nvidia board-partner, MSI.

== See also ==
- List of Nvidia graphics processing units
- GeForce 400 series
- GeForce 500 series
- GeForce 600 series
- GeForce GTX 10 series
- GeForce GTX 16 series
- GeForce RTX 20 series
- GeForce RTX 30 series
- GeForce RTX 40 series
- GeForce RTX 50 series
- Nvidia Quadro
- Nvidia Tesla
