= Mark Kilgard =

American computer programmer

Mark J. Kilgard is a graphics software engineer working at Nvidia.

Prior to joining Nvidia, Mark Kilgard worked at Compaq and Silicon Graphics. While at Silicon Graphics, he authored the OpenGL Utility Toolkit, better known as GLUT, to make it easy to write OpenGL-based 3D examples and demos. The primary reason for this was the lack of a windowing and input API with OpenGL using GLX.

A montage of four OpenGL technical demos disseminated in 1997 with source code by Mark Kilgard

Mark Kilgard wrote and released many OpenGL technical sample programs during the pushback against Microsoft's competitive FUD against the API, and his GLUT toolkit (ported to Windows by Nate Robins) allowed these examples to run cross platform on Windows PC systems as well as SGI workstations.

At Nvidia, Mark Kilgard has helped design important parts of 3D graphics APIs. He has written key whitepapers, including "Cg in Two Pages". He is the lead author of the NV path rendering extension—a GPU-accelerated method for rendering vector graphics.

Kilgard graduated from Rice University. He has written two books: OpenGL for the X Window System (1996), and The Cg Tutorial (2003), co-authored with Randima Fernando.
