= GeForce 400 series =

Series of GPUs by Nvidia

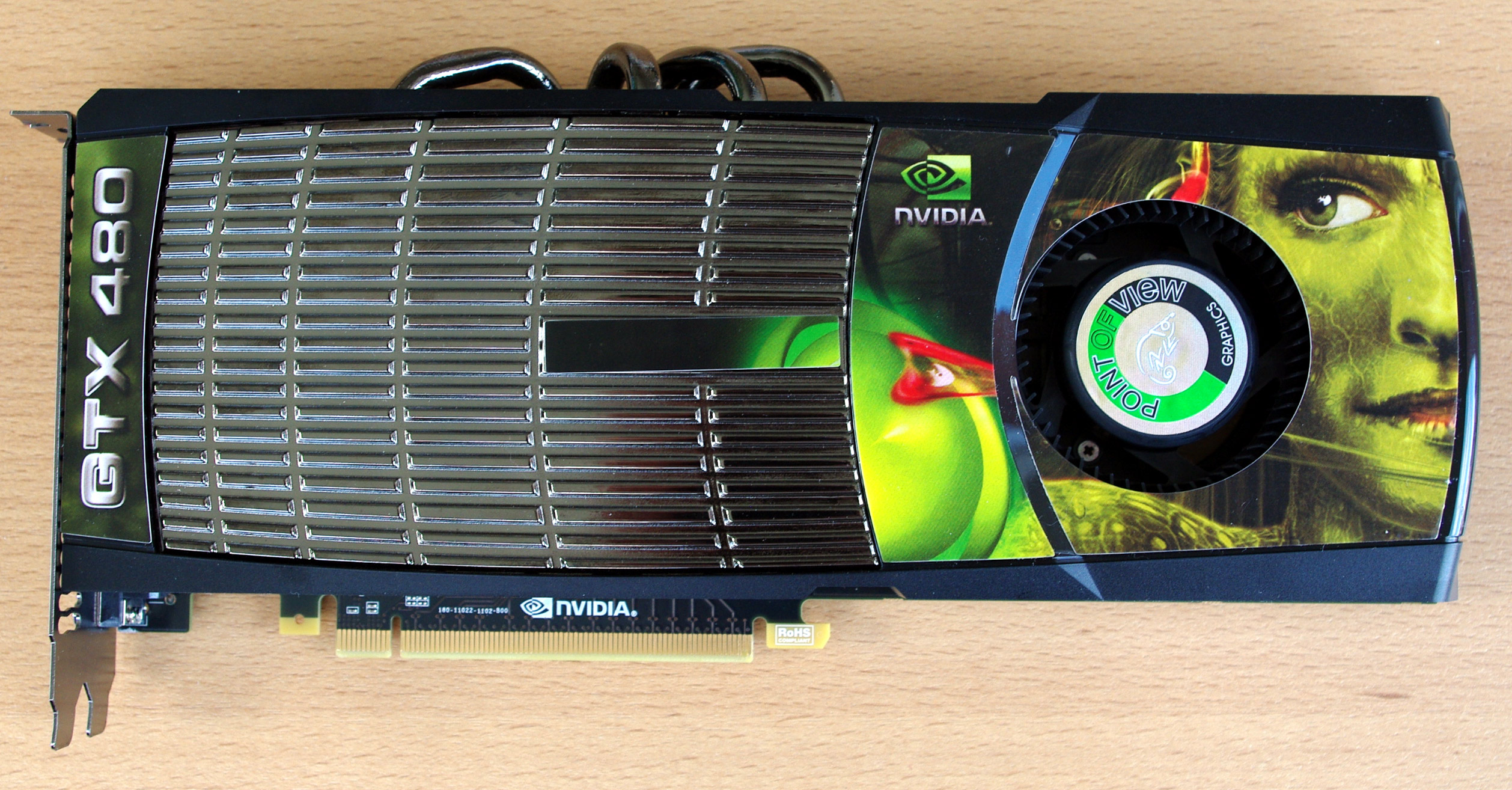
- A Nvidia GeForce GTX 480 released in 2010, the series' flagship model
- Release date: April 12, 2010; 16 years ago
- Codename: GF10x
- Architecture: Fermi
- Models: GeForce series: GeForce GT series; GeForce GTS series; GeForce GTX series
- Transistors: 260M 40 nm (GT218 - GeForce GT 405 only): 585M 40 nm (GF108); 1.170M 40 nm (GF106); 1.950M 40 nm (GF104); 1.950M 40 nm (GF114); 3.200M 40 nm (GF100)

Cards
- Entry-level: GT 405; GT 420; GT 430
- Mid-range: GT 440; GTS 450; GTX 460; GTX 460 SE; GTX 460 SE v2 GTX 465
- High-end: GTX 470; GTX 480

API support
- Direct3D: Direct3D 12.0 (feature level 11_0); Direct3D 11.1 (feature level 10_1, GeForce GT 405 only); Shader Model 5.1; Shader Model 4.1 (GeForce GT 405 only)
- OpenCL: OpenCL 1.1
- OpenGL: OpenGL 4.6

History
- Predecessor: GeForce 200 series
- Successor: GeForce 500 series

Support status
- Unsupported

The GeForce 400 series is a series of graphics processing units developed by Nvidia, serving as the introduction of the Fermi microarchitecture. Its release was originally slated in November 2009, however, after delays, it was released on March 26, 2010, with availability following in April 2010.

Its direct competitor was ATI's Radeon HD 5000 series.

== Architecture ==
Nvidia described the Fermi microarchitecture as the next major step in its line of GPUs following the Tesla microarchitecture used since the G80. The GF100, the first Fermi-architecture product, is large: 512 stream processors, in sixteen groups of 32, and 3.0 billion transistors, manufactured by TSMC in a 40 nm process. It is Nvidia's first chip to support OpenGL 4.0 and Direct3D 11. No products with a fully enabled GF100 GPU were ever sold. The GTX 480 had one streaming multiprocessor disabled. The GTX 470 had two streaming multiprocessors and one memory controller disabled. The GTX 465 had five streaming multiprocessors and two memory controllers disabled. Consumer GeForce cards came with 256MB attached to each of the enabled GDDR5 memory controllers, for a total of 1.5, 1.25 or 1.0GB; the Tesla C2050 had 512MB on each of six controllers, and the Tesla C2070 had 1024MB per controller. Both the Tesla cards had fourteen active groups of stream processors.

The chips found in the high performance Tesla branding feature memory with optional ECC and the ability to perform one double-precision floating-point operation per cycle per core; the consumer GeForce cards are artificially driver restricted to one DP operation per four cycles. With these features, combined with support for Visual Studio and C++, Nvidia targeted professional and commercial markets, as well as use in high performance computing.

Fermi is named after Italian physicist Enrico Fermi.

=== Current limitations and trade-offs ===
The quantity of on-board SRAM per ALU actually decreased proportionally compared to the previous G200 generation, despite the increase of the L2 cache from 256kB per 240 ALUs to 768kB per 512 ALUs, since Fermi has only 32768 registers per 32 ALUs (vs. 16384 per 8 ALUs), only 48kB of shared memory per 32 ALUs (vs. 16kB per 8 ALUs), and only 16kB of cache per 32 ALUs (vs. 8kB constant cache per 8 ALUs + 24kB texture cache per 24 ALUs). Parameters such as the number of registers can be found in the CUDA Compute Capability Comparison Table in the reference manual.

== History ==
On September 30, 2009, Nvidia released a white paper describing the architecture: the chip features 16 'Streaming Multiprocessors' each with 32 'CUDA Cores' capable of one single-precision operation per cycle or one double-precision operation every other cycle, a 40-bit virtual address space which allows the host's memory to be mapped into the chip's address space, meaning that there is only one kind of pointer and making C++ support significantly easier, and a 384-bit wide GDDR5 memory interface. As with the G80 and GT200, threads are scheduled in 'warps', sets of 32 threads each running on a single shader core. While the GT200 had 16 KB 'shared memory' associated with each shader cluster, and required data to be read through the texturing units if a cache was needed, GF100 has 64 KB of memory associated with each cluster, which can be used either as a 48 KB cache plus 16 KB of shared memory, or as a 16 KB cache plus 48 KB of shared memory, along with a 768 KB L2 cache shared by all 16 clusters.

The white paper describes the chip much more as a general purpose processor for workloads encompassing tens of thousands of threads - reminiscent of the Tera MTA architecture, though without that machine's support for very efficient random memory access - than as a graphics processor.

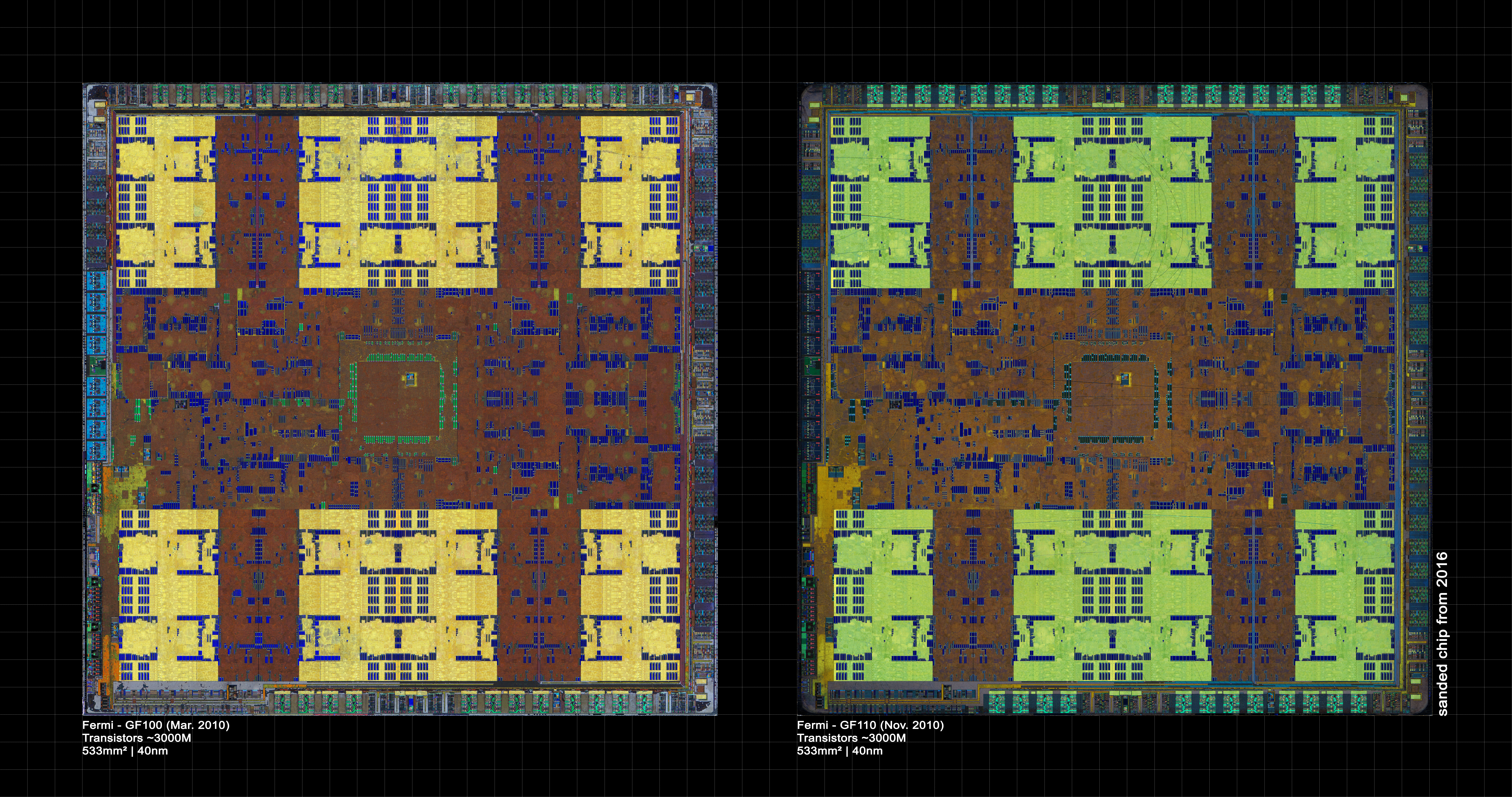
GeForce GTX 480 die underside (GF100)

Many users reported high temperatures and power consumption while receiving correspondingly poor performance improvement in the GeForce 400 series Fermi GPUs when compared to rival competitor AMD's Radeon HD 5000 series - leading AMD to create and release a promotional video "The Misunderstanding" to poke fun at the issue. In the video, a police unit is seen commencing a raid on a house with a large thermal profile, indicating a grow operation. However, upon entering the home it is apparent that the source of the high temperature is a Fermi GPU. It became a common joke that one could fry an egg on a Fermi GPU at full load.

== Products ==
- ^{1} SPs - Shader Processors - Unified Shaders: Texture mapping units: Render output units
- ^{2} Each Streaming Multiprocessor (SM) in the GPU of GF100 architecture contains 32 SPs and 4 SFUs. Each Streaming Multiprocessor (SM) in the GPU of GF104/106/108 architecture contains 48 SPs and 8 SFUs. Each SP can fulfil 2 single precision fused multiply–add (FMA) operations per cycle. Each SFU can fulfil four SF operations per cycle. One FMA operation counts for two floating point operations. So the theoretical single precision peak performance, with shader count [n] and shader frequency [f, GHz], can be estimated by the following, FLOPS_{sp} ≈ f × n × 2 (FMA). Total Processing Power: for GF100 FLOPS_{sp} ≈ f × m ×(32 SPs × 2(FMA) + 4 × 4 SFUs) and for GF104/106/108 FLOPS_{sp} ≈ f × m × (48 SPs × 2(FMA) + 4 × 8 SFUs) or for GF100 FLOPS_{sp} ≈ f × n × 2.5 and for GF104/106/108 FLOPS_{sp} ≈ f × n × 8 / 3.

SP - Shader Processor (Unified Shader, CUDA Core), SFU - Special Function Unit, SM - Streaming Multiprocessor.

- ^{3} Each SM in the GF100 contains 4 texture filtering units for every texture address unit. The complete GF100 die contains 64 texture address units and 256 texture filtering units Each SM in the GF104/106/108 architecture contains 8 texture filtering units for every texture address unit. The complete GF104 die contains 64 texture address units and 512 texture filtering units, the complete GF106 die contains 32 texture address units and 256 texture filtering units and the complete GF108 die contains 16 texture address units and 128 texture filtering units.

All products are produced on a 40 nm fabrication process. All products support Direct3D 12.0 on a feature level 11_0, OpenGL 4.6 and OpenCL 1.1. The only exception is the GeForce 405, an OEM-only card, which is based on the GT218 (Tesla) core only supporting DirectX 11.1 with feature level 10_1, OpenGL 3.3 and no OpenCL support, and is the only card in the GeForce 400 range not based on the Fermi microarchitecture. By the parameters, the GeForce 405 is identical to the GeForce 310, also an OEM only card, which is itself based on the GeForce 210. All products have a single DB15 VGA connector on a full height and full length card, except as listed otherwise.

On November 8, 2010, Nvidia released the GF110 chip, along with the GTX 580 (480's replacement). It is a redesigned GF100 chip, which uses significantly less power. This allowed Nvidia to enable all 16 SMs (all 16 cores), which was previously impossible on the GF100 "Nvidia GeForce GTX 580". Various features of the GF100 architecture were only available on the more expensive Quadro and Tesla series of cards. For the GeForce consumer products, double precision performance is a quarter of that of the "full" Fermi architecture. Error checking and correcting memory (ECC) also does not operate on consumer cards. The GF100 cards provide Compute Capability 2.0, while the GF104/106/108 cards provide Compute Capability 2.1.

== Chipset table ==
| Model | Launch | Code name | Fab (nm) | Transistors (million) | Die size (mm^{2}) | SM count | Core config (Note: Unified shaders: texture mapping units: render output units) (Note: Each SM in the GF100 contains 4 texture filtering units for every texture address unit. The complete GF100 die contains 64 texture address units and 256 texture filtering units. Each SM in the GF104/106/108 architecture contains 8 texture filtering units for every texture address unit but has doubled both addressing and filtering units. The complete GF104 die also contains 64 texture address units and 512 texture filtering units despite the halved SM count, the complete GF106 die contains 32 texture address units and 256 texture filtering units and the complete GF108 die contains 16 texture address units and 128 texture filtering units.) | Clock rate | | | Fillrate | | Memory configuration | | | | Supported API version | | | | Processing power (GFLOPS) (Note: To calculate the processing power see Fermi (microarchitecture)#Performance.) | | TDP (Watts) (Note: Note that while GTX 460's TDP is comparable to that of AMD's HD5000 series, GF100-based cards (GTX 480/470/465) are rated much lower but pull significantly more power, e.g. GTX 480 with 250W TDP consumes More power than an HD 5970 with 297W TDP.) | Release price (USD) |
| Model | Launch | Code name | Fab (nm) | Transistors (million) | Die size (mm^{2}) | SM count | Core config | Core (MHz) | Shader (MHz) | Memory (MHz) | Pixel (GP/s) | Texture (GT/s) | Size (MB) | Bandwidth (GB/s) | DRAM type | Bus width (bit) | Vulkan | Direct3D | OpenGL | OpenCL (Note: The 400 series is the only non-OEM family from GeForce 9 to 700 series not to include an official dual-GPU system. However, on March 18, 2011, EVGA released the first single-PCB card with dual 460s on board. The card came with 2048 MB of memory at 3600 MHz and 672 shader processors at 1400 MHz and was offered at the MSRP of $429.) | Single precision | Double precision | TDP (Watts) | Release price (USD) |
|---|---|---|---|---|---|---|---|---|---|---|---|---|---|---|---|---|---|---|---|---|---|---|---|---|
| GeForce 405 (Note: The GeForce 405 card is a rebranded GeForce 310 which itself is a rebranded GeForce 210.) | September 16, 2011 | GT216; GT218 | 40 nm | 486; 260 | 100; 57 | 1 | 48:16:8; 16:8:4 | 475; 589 | 1100; 1402 | 800; 790 | 3.8; 2.36 | 7.6; 4.71 | 512; 1024 | 12.6 | DDR3 | 64 | n/a | 11.1 (FL 10_1) | 3.3 | 1.1 | 105.6; 44.86 | Unknown | 30.5 | OEM |
| GeForce GT 420 | September 3, 2010 | GF108 | TSMC 40 nm | 585 | 116 | 1 | 48:4:4 | 700 | 1400 | 1800 | 2.8 | 2.8 | 512 | 28.8 | GDDR3 | 128 | n/a | 12 (FL 11_0) | 4.6 | 1.1 | 134.4 | Unknown | 50 | OEM |
| GeForce GT 430 | October 11, 2010 | GF108; GF108-300-A1 | TSMC 40 nm | 585 | 116 | 2 | 96:16:4 | 700 | 1400 | 1600; 1800 | 2.8 | 11.2 | 512 | 25.6; 28.8 | GDDR3 | 128 | n/a | 12 (FL 11_0) | 4.6 | 1.2 | 268.8 | Unknown | 60 | OEM |
| GeForce GT 430 | October 11, 2010 | GF108; GF108-300-A1 | TSMC 40 nm | 585 | 116 | 2 | 96:16:4 | 700 | 1400 | 1800 | 2.8 | 11.2 | 512; 1024; 2048 | 28.8 | GDDR3 | 128 | n/a | 12 (FL 11_0) | 4.6 | 1.1 | 268.8 | Unknown | 49 | 79 |
| GeForce GT 430 | October 11, 2010 | GF108; GF108-300-A1 | TSMC 40 nm | 585 | 116 | 2 | 96:16:4 | 700 | 1400 | 1300 | 2.8 | 11.2 | 512; 1024; 2048 | 10.4 | GDDR3 | 64 | n/a | 12 (FL 11_0) | 4.6 | 1.1 | 268.8 | Unknown | 49 | 79 |
| GeForce GT 440 | February 1, 2011 | GF108 | TSMC 40 nm | 585 | 116 | 2 | 96:16:4 | 810 | 1620 | 1800; 3200 | 3.2 | 12.9 | 512; 1024 | 28.8; 51.2 | GDDR3; GDDR5 | 128 | n/a | 12 (FL 11_0) | 4.6 | 1.1 | 311.04 | Unknown | 65 | 100 |
| GeForce GT 440 | October 11, 2010 | GF106 | TSMC 40 nm | 1170 | 238 | 3 | 144:24:24 | 594 | 1189 | 1600; 1800 | 4.86 | 19.44 | 1536; 3072 | 43.2 | DDR3 | 192 | n/a | 12 (FL 11_0) | 4.6 | 1.1 | 342.43 | Unknown | 56 | OEM |
| GeForce GTS 450 | October 11, 2010 | GF106 | TSMC 40 nm | 1170 | 238 | 3 | 144:24:24 | 790 | 1580 | 4000 | 4.7 | 18.9 | 1536 | 96.0 | GDDR5 | 192 | n/a | 12 (FL 11_0) | 4.6 | 1.1 | 455.04 | Unknown | 106 | OEM |
| GeForce GTS 450 | September 13, 2010; March 15, 2011 | GF106-250; GF116-200 | TSMC 40 nm | 1170 | 238 | 4 | 192:32:16 | 783 | 1566 | 1200-1600 (GDDR3); 3608 (GDDR5) | 6.2 | 25.0 | 512; 1024 | 57.7 | GDDR5 | 128 | n/a | 12 (FL 11_0) | 4.6 | 1.1 | 601.34 | Unknown | 106 | 129 |
| GeForce GTX 460 SE | November 15, 2010 | GF104-225-A1 | TSMC 40 nm | 1950 | 332 | 6 | 288:48:32 | 650 | 1300 | 3400 | 7.8 | 31.2 | 1024 | 108.8 | GDDR5 | 256 | n/a | 12 (FL 11_0) | 4.6 | 1.1 | 748.8 | Unknown | 150 | 160 |
| GeForce GTX 460 | October 11, 2010 | GF104 | TSMC 40 nm | 1950 | 332 | 7 | 336:56:32 | 650 | 1300 | 3400 | 9.1 | 36.4 | 1024 | 108.8 | GDDR5 | 256 | n/a | 12 (FL 11_0) | 4.6 | 1.1 | 873.6 | Unknown | 150 | OEM |
| GeForce GTX 460 | July 12, 2010 | GF104-300-KB-A1 | TSMC 40 nm | 1950 | 332 | 7 | 336:56:24 | 675 | 1350 | 3600 | 9.4 | 37.8 | 768 | 86.4 | GDDR5 | 192 | n/a | 12 (FL 11_0) | 4.6 | 1.1 | 907.2 | Unknown | 150 | 199 |
| GeForce GTX 460 | July 12, 2010 | GF104-300-KB-A1 | TSMC 40 nm | 1950 | 332 | 7 | 336:56:32 | 675 | 1350 | 3600 | 9.4 | 37.8 | 1024; 2048 | 115.2 | GDDR5 | 256 | n/a | 12 (FL 11_0) | 4.6 | 1.1 | 907.2 | Unknown | 160 | 229 |
| GeForce GTX 460 | September 24, 2011 | GF114 | TSMC 40 nm | 1950 | 332 | 7 | 336:56:24 | 779 | 1557 | 4008 | 10.9 | 43.6 | 1024 | 96.2 | GDDR5 | 192 | n/a | 12 (FL 11_0) | 4.6 | 1.1 | 1045.6 | Unknown | 160 | 199 |
| GeForce GTX 465 | May 31, 2010 | GF100-030-A3 | TSMC 40 nm | 3000 | 529 | 11 | 352:44:32 | 608 | 1215 | 3206 | 13.3 | 26.7 | 1024 | 102.7 | GDDR5 | 256 | n/a | 12 (FL 11_0) | 4.6 | 1.2 | 855.36 | 106.92 | 200 | 279 |
| GeForce GTX 470 | March 26, 2010 | GF100-275-A3 | TSMC 40 nm | 3000 | 529 | 14 | 448:56:40 | 608 | 1215 | 3348 | 17.0 | 34.0 | 1280 | 133.9 | GDDR5 | 320 | n/a | 12 (FL 11_0) | 4.6 | 1.2 | 1088.64 | 136.08 | 215 | 349 |
| GeForce GTX 480 | March 26, 2010 | GF100-375-A3 | TSMC 40 nm | 3000 | 529 | 15 | 480:60:48 | 701 | 1401 | 3696 | 21.0 | 42.0 | 1536 | 177.4 | GDDR5 | 384 | n/a | 12 (FL 11_0) | 4.6 | 1.2 | 1344.96 | 168.12 | 250 | 499 |
| Model | Launch | Code name | Fab (nm) | Transistors (million) | Die size (mm^{2}) | SM count | Core config | Clock rate | | | Fillrate | | Memory configuration | | | | Supported API version | | | | Processing power (GFLOPS) | | TDP (Watts) | Release price (USD) |
| Model | Launch | Code name | Fab (nm) | Transistors (million) | Die size (mm^{2}) | SM count | Core config | Core (MHz) | Shader (MHz) | Memory (MHz) | Pixel (GP/s) | Texture (GT/s) | Size (MB) | Bandwidth (GB/s) | DRAM type | Bus width (bit) | Vulkan | Direct3D | OpenGL | OpenCL | Single precision | Double precision | TDP (Watts) | Release price (USD) |

== Support ==
Nvidia announced that after Release 390 drivers, it will no longer release 32-bit drivers for 32-bit operating systems.

Nvidia announced in April 2018 that Fermi will move to legacy driver support status and be maintained until January 2019.

== Gallery ==
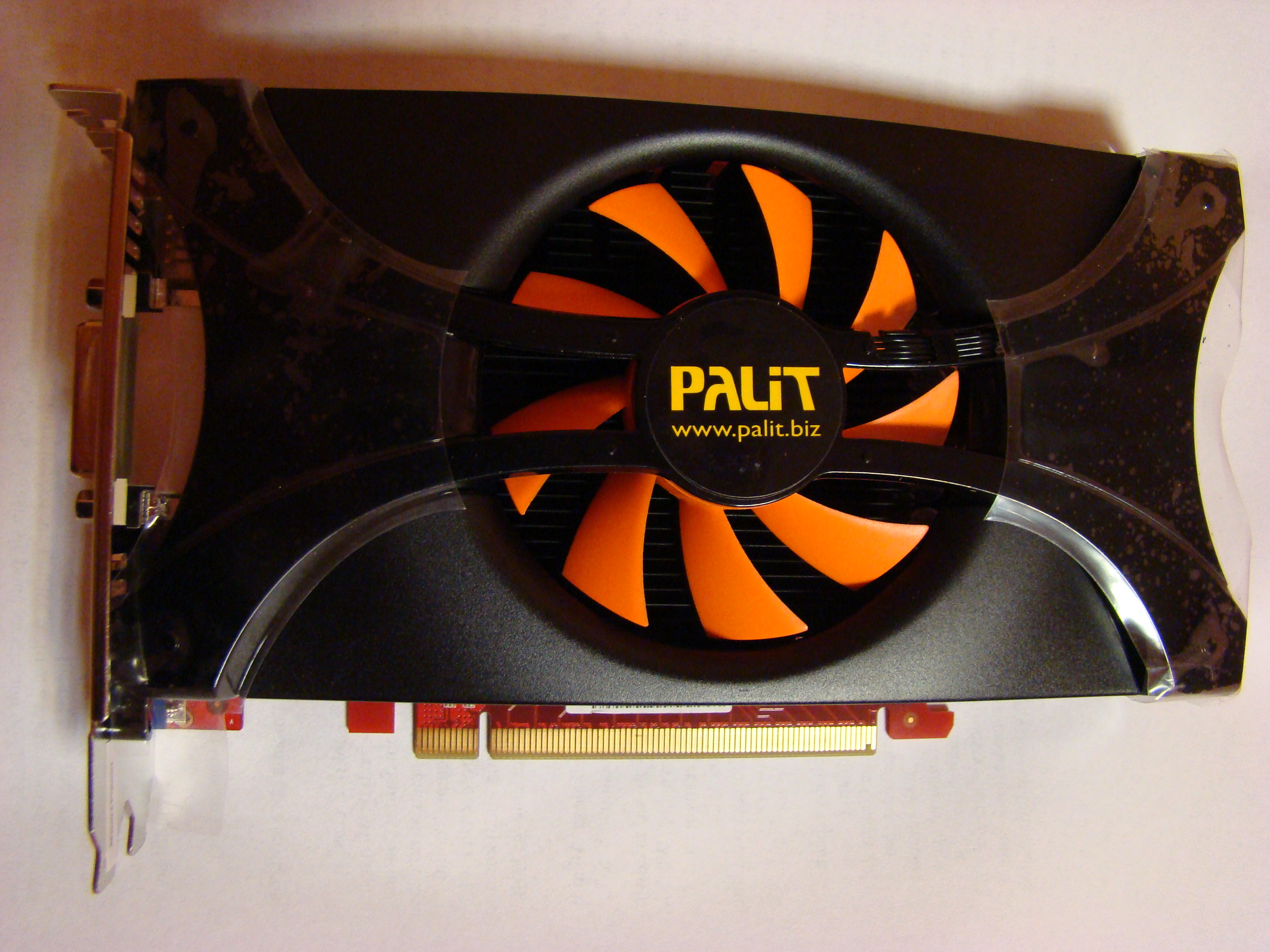
Palit GeForce GTX460

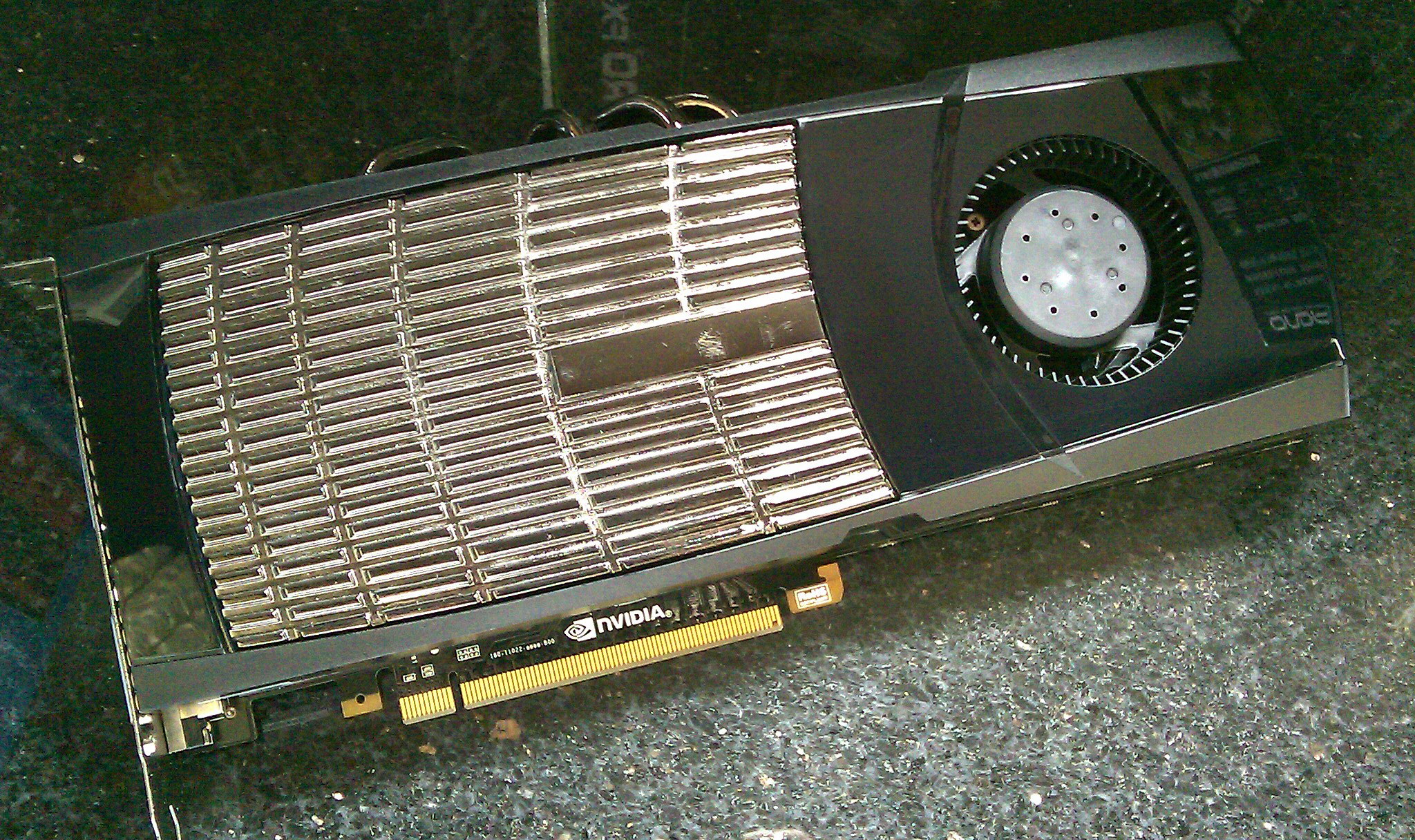
Nvidia GeForce GTX 480 Founders Edition

== See also ==
- GeForce 200 series
- GeForce 500 series
- GeForce 600 series
- GeForce 700 series
- GeForce 800M series
- GeForce 900 series
- Nvidia Quadro
- Nvidia Tesla

== Notes ==
- David Kanter (September 30, 2009). "Inside Fermi: Nvidia's HPC Push". realworldtech.com.
