= Glbinding =

glbinding
- Original author: Computer Graphics Systems Group at HPI
- Developer: CGInternals GmbH
- Stable release: 3.3.0 / February 12, 2023; 3 years ago
- Written in: C++ and Python
- Platform: Cross-platform
- License: MIT License
- Website: glbinding.org
- Repository: github.com/cginternals/glbinding

glbinding is a generated, cross-platform C++ binding for OpenGL which is solely based on the new XML-based OpenGL API specification (gl.xml). It is a fully fledged OpenGL API binding, compatible with current code based on other C bindings, e.g., GLEW. The binding is generated using Python scripts and templates, that can be easily adapted to fit custom needs. It leverages modern C++11 features like scoped enums, lambdas, and variadic templates, instead of relying on macros (all OpenGL symbols are real functions and variables). It provides type-safe parameters, per feature API header, lazy function resolution, multi-context and multi-thread support, global function callbacks, meta information about the generated OpenGL binding and the OpenGL runtime, as well as multiple examples for quick-starting projects.

The complete glbinding source code including the generated files are published under the MIT License.

== See also ==
- OpenGL Easy Extension library (GLee)
- OpenGL Extension Wrangler Library (GLEW)
