= OpenGL Utility Library =

- Other names: GLU
- Original authors: Silicon Graphics, Inc. (SGI)
- Initial release: 1992
- Stable release: 1.3 / 2001
- Repository: https://gitlab.freedesktop.org/mesa/mesa.
- Written in: C
- License: Originally proprietary, later MIT with Mesa.
- Website: https://opengl.org

The OpenGL Utility Library (GLU) is a computer graphics library for OpenGL.

It consists of a number of functions that use the base OpenGL library to provide higher-level drawing routines from the more primitive routines that OpenGL provides. It is usually distributed with the base OpenGL package. GLU is not implemented in the embedded version of the OpenGL package, OpenGL ES.

Among these features are mapping between screen- and world-coordinates, generation of texture mipmaps, drawing of quadric surfaces, NURBS, tessellation of polygonal primitives, interpretation of OpenGL error codes, an extended range of transformation routines for setting up viewing volumes and simple positioning of the camera, generally in more human-friendly terms than the routines presented by OpenGL. It also provides additional primitives for use in OpenGL applications, including spheres, cylinders and disks.

All GLU functions start with the glu prefix. An example function is gluOrtho2D which defines a two dimensional orthographic projection matrixand and gluLookAt that orientates a camera.

The GLU specification was last updated in 1998, and it depends on features which were deprecated with the release of OpenGL 3.1 in 2009. Specifications for GLU are still available here

== See also ==
- FreeGLUT
- OpenGL User Interface Library (GLUI)
- OpenGL Utility Toolkit (GLUT)
