= Freeglut =

freeglut
- Official logo
- Developer: Paweł W. Olszta
- Stable release: 3.8.0 / November 16, 2025; 6 months ago
- Written in: C
- Operating system: Cross-platform
- Type: API
- License: X Consortium
- Website: freeglut.sourceforge.net
- Repository: github.com/FreeGLUTProject/freeglut

freeglut is an open-source alternative to the OpenGL Utility Toolkit (GLUT) library. GLUT (and hence freeglut) enables the user to create and manage windows containing OpenGL contexts on a wide range of platforms and also read the mouse, keyboard and joystick functions. freeglut is intended to be a full replacement for GLUT, and has only a few differences.

Since GLUT has gone into stagnation, freeglut is in development to improve the toolkit. It is released under the MIT License.

== History ==
freeglut was originally written by Paweł W. Olszta with contributions from Andreas Umbach and Steve Baker. Since Paweł ceased working in 3D graphics, he passed the baton to Steve Baker. The current maintainers of freeglut are John F. Fay, John Tsiombikas, and Diederick C. Niehorster.

Paweł started freeglut development on December 1, 1999. The project is now virtually a 100 % replacement for the original GLUT with only a few departures (such as the abandonment of SGI-specific features such as the Dials&Buttons box and Dynamic Video Resolution) and a shrinking set of bugs.

freeglut contains a few enhancements over the original GLUT - but as a matter of policy, no further significant features will be added.

In April 2015, freeglut obtained initial support for the new Wayland display server protocol.

In later years, freeglut received many small modernizations, including improved Cocoa support on macOS, refinements to X11 and Windows backends, better multi-monitor and Unicode handling, and portability updates for platforms such as Wii/GameCube. Numerous long-standing GLUT quirks were fixed while maintaining the project’s policy of avoiding major new features.

=== OpenGLUT ===
Some members of the freeglut team who wanted to add features forked the code to create OpenGLUT.

Development of OpenGLUT ceased in May 2005; the last release was OpenGLUT-0.6.3 in March 2005.

== Status ==
freeglut is now very stable and has fewer bugs than the original GLUT. However, there are places where the original GLUT specification did not make clear what order things like callbacks occur, and it is possible for application programs that work under GLUT to fail under freeglut because they assume something that GLUT never guaranteed to be true.

New revisions appear periodically; however, since it is now quite stable and no new features are planned, these updates are required less and less often. This would change if there was ever a new release of GLUT.

freeglut is distributed instead of GLUT in some Linux distributions. Since it is upwards compatible at a binary level, programs compiled for GLUT can be linked to freeglut without problems.

== See also ==
- EGL – an interface between OpenGL ES or OpenVG and a windowing system
- OpenGL User Interface Library (GLUI)
- OpenGL Utility Library (GLU)
- OpenGL Utility Toolkit (GLUT)
