= GeForce 500 series =

Series of GPUs by Nvidia

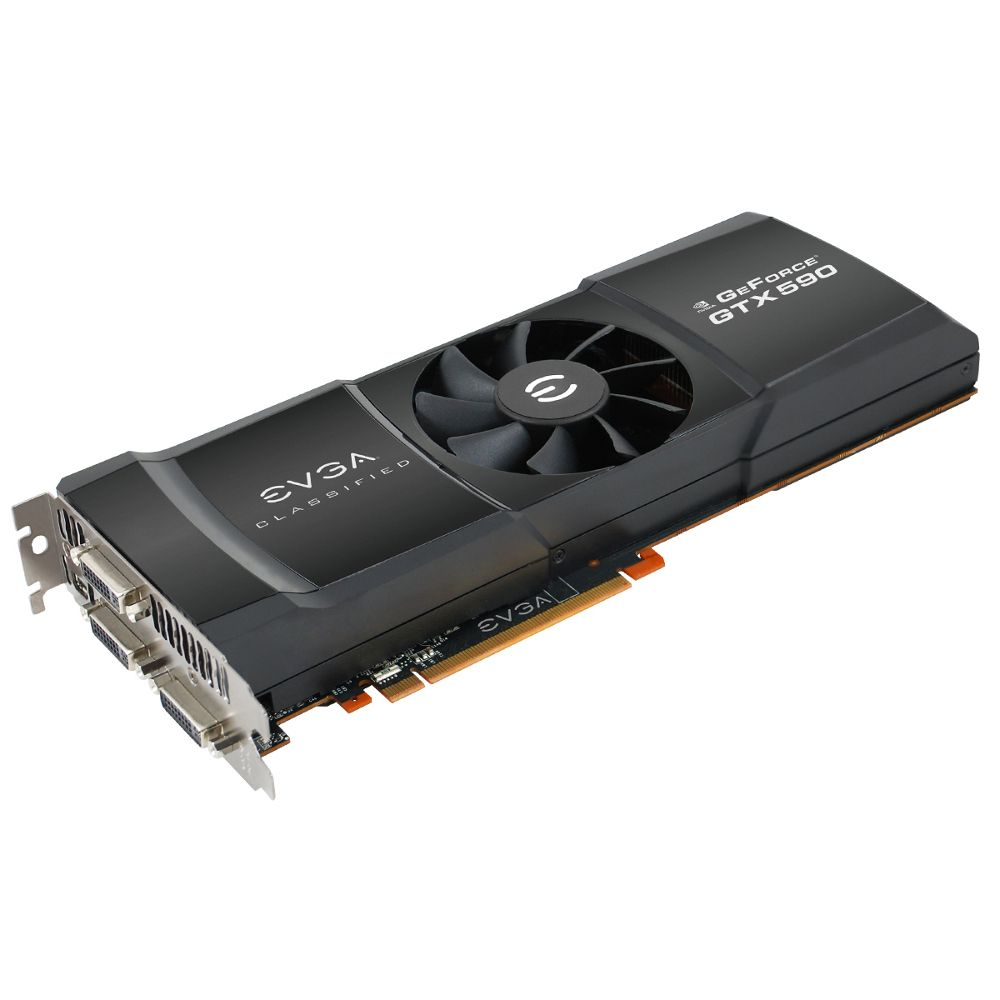
- A Nvidia GeForce GTX 590 released in 2011, the series' flagship model; this one from EVGA
- Release date: November 9, 2010; 15 years ago
- Codename: GF11x
- Architecture: Fermi
- Models: GeForce series: GeForce GT series; GeForce GTX series
- Transistors: 292M 40 nm (GF119): 585M 40 nm (GF108); 1.170M 40 nm (GF116); 1.950M 40 nm (GF114); 3.000M 40 nm (GF110)

Cards
- Entry-level: 510; GT 520; GT 530
- Mid-range: GT 545; GTX 550 Ti; GTX 555; GTX 560; GTX 560 Ti; GTX 560 SE
- High-end: GTX 570; GTX 580
- Enthusiast: GTX 590

API support
- Direct3D: Direct3D 12.0 (feature level 11_0); Shader Model 5.1
- OpenCL: OpenCL 1.1
- OpenGL: OpenGL 4.6

History
- Predecessor: GeForce 400 series
- Successor: GeForce 600 series

Support status
- Unsupported

The GeForce 500 series is a series of graphics processing units developed by Nvidia, as a refresh of the Fermi based GeForce 400 series. It was first released on November 9, 2010 with the GeForce GTX 580.

Its direct competitor was AMD's Radeon HD 6000 series; they were launched approximately a month apart.

== Overview ==
The Nvidia Geforce 500 series graphics cards are significantly modified versions of the GeForce 400 series graphics cards, in terms of performance and power management. Like the Nvidia GeForce 400 series graphics cards, the Nvidia GeForce 500 series supports Direct3D 12.0 (feature level 11.0), OpenGL 4.6, and OpenCL 1.1.

The refreshed Fermi chip includes 512 stream processors, grouped in 16 stream multiprocessors clusters (each with 32 CUDA cores), and is manufactured by TSMC in a 40 nm process.

The Nvidia GeForce GTX 580 graphics card is the first in the Nvidia GeForce 500 series to use a fully enabled chip based on the refreshed Fermi architecture, with all 16 stream multiprocessors clusters and all six 64-bit memory controllers active. The new GF110 GPU was enhanced with full speed FP16 filtering (the previous generation GF100 GPU could only do half-speed FP16 filtering) and improved z-culling units.

On January 25, 2011, Nvidia launched the GeForce GTX 560 Ti, to target the "sweet spot" segment where price/performance ratio is considered important. With its more than 30% improvement over the GTX 460, and performance in between the Radeon HD 6870 and 6950 1GB, the GTX 560 Ti directly replaced the GeForce GTX 470.

On February 17, 2011, it was reported that the GeForce GTX 550 Ti would be launching on March 15, 2011. Although the GTX 550 Ti is a GF116 mainstream chip, Nvidia chose to name its new card the GTX 550 Ti, and not the GTS 550. Performance was shown to be at least comparable and up to 12% faster than the current Radeon HD 5770. Price-wise, the new card trod into the range occupied by the GeForce GTX 460 (768 MB) and the Radeon HD 6790.

On March 24, 2011, the GTX 590 was launched as the flagship graphics card for Nvidia. The GTX 590 is a dual-GPU card, similar to past releases such as the GTX 295, and boasted the potential to handle Nvidia's 3D Vision technology by itself.

On April 13, 2011, the GT 520 was launched as the bottom-end card in the range, with lower performance than the equivalent number cards in the two previous generations, the GT 220 and the GT 420. However, it supported DirectX 11 and was more powerful than the GeForce 210, the GeForce 310, and the integrated graphics options on Intel CPUs.

On May 17, 2011, Nvidia launched a less expensive (non-Ti) version of the GeForce GTX 560 to strengthen Nvidia's price-performance in the $200 range. Like the faster GTX 560 Ti that came before it, this video card was also faster than the GeForce GTX 460. Standard versions of this card performed comparably to the AMD Radeon HD 6870, and would eventually replace the GeForce GTX 460. Premium versions of this card operate at higher speed (factory overclocked), and are slightly faster than the Radeon 6870, approaching the performance of basic versions of the Radeon HD 6950 and the GeForce GTX 560 Ti.

On November 28, 2011, Nvidia launched the "GTX 560 Ti With 448 Cores". However, it does not use the silicon of the GTX 560 series: it is a GF110 chip with two shader blocks disabled. The most powerful version of the 560 series, this card was widely known to be a "limited production" card and was used as a marketing tool making use of the popularity of the GTX 560 brand for the 2011 Holiday season. The performance of the card resides between the regular 560 Ti and 570.

== Products ==
=== GeForce 500 (5xx) series ===
- ^{1} Unified shaders: Texture mapping units: Render output units
- ^{2} Each Streaming Multiprocessor (SM) in the GPU of GF110 architecture contains 32 SPs and 4 SFUs. Each Streaming Multiprocessor (SM) in the GPU of GF114/116/118 architecture contains 48 SPs and 8 SFUs. Each SP can fulfil up to two single precision operations FMA per clock. Each SFU can fulfil up to four operations SF per clock. The approximate ratio of operations FMA to operations SF is equal 4:1. The theoretical shader performance in single-precision floating point operations (FMA)[FLOPS_{sp}, GFLOPS] of the graphics card with shader count [n] and shader frequency [f, GHz], is estimated by the following: FLOPS_{sp} ˜ f × n × 2. Alternative formula: FLOPS _{sp} ˜ f × m × (32 SPs × 2(FMA)). [m] – SM count. Total Processing Power: FLOPS_{sp} ˜ f × m × (32 SPs × 2(FMA) + 4 × 4 SFUs) or FLOPS_{sp} ˜ f × n × 2.5.
- ^{3} Each SM in the GF110 contains 4 texture filtering units for every texture address unit. The complete GF110 die contains 64 texture address units and 256 texture filtering units. Each SM in the GF114/116/118 architecture contains 8 texture filtering units for every texture address unit but has doubled both addressing and filtering units.

All products are produced using a 40 nm fabrication process. All products support DirectX 12.0, OpenGL 4.6 and OpenCL 1.1.

=== GeForce 500M (5xxM) series ===
The GeForce 500M series for notebook architecture.

- ^{1} Unified shaders: Texture mapping units: Render output units

| Model | Launch | Code name | Fab (nm) | Bus interface | Core config^{1} | Clock speed | | | Fillrate | | Memory | | | | API support (version) | | | | Processing Power^{2} (GFLOPS) | TDP (watts) | Notes |
| Model | Launch | Code name | Fab (nm) | Bus interface | Core config^{1} | Core (MHz) | Shader (MHz) | Memory (MHz) | Pixel (GP/s) | Texture (GT/s) | Size (MiB) | Bandwidth (GB/s) | Bus type | Bus width (bit) | DirectX | OpenGL | OpenCL | Vulkan | Processing Power^{2} (GFLOPS) | TDP (watts) | Notes |
|---|---|---|---|---|---|---|---|---|---|---|---|---|---|---|---|---|---|---|---|---|---|
| GeForce GT 520M | January 5, 2011 | GF119 | 40 | PCIe 2.0 x16 | 48:8:4 | 740 | 1480 | 1600 | 2.96 | 5.92 | 1024 | 12.8 | DDR3 | 64 | 12.0 (11_0) | 4.6 | 1.1 | —N/a | 142.08 | 12 | |
| GeForce GT 520M | | GF108 | 40 | PCIe 2.0 x16 | 96:16:4 | 515 | 1030 | 1600 | 2.06 | 8.24 | 1024 | 12.8 | DDR3 | 64 | 12.0 (11_0) | 4.6 | 1.1 | —N/a | 197.76 | 20 | Noticed in Lenovo laptops |
| GeForce GT 520MX | May 30, 2011 | GF119 | 40 | PCIe 2.0 x16 | 48:8:4 | 900 | 1800 | 1800 | 3.6 | 7.2 | 1024 | 14.4 | DDR3 | 64 | 12.0 (11_0) | 4.6 | 1.1 | —N/a | 172.8 | 20 | |
| GeForce GT 525M | January 5, 2011 | GF108 | 40 | PCIe 2.0 x16 | 96:16:4 | 600 | 1200 | 1800 | 2.4 | 9.6 | 1024 | 28.8 | DDR3 | 128 | 12.0 (11_0) | 4.6 | 1.1 | —N/a | 230.4 | 20-23 | |
| GeForce GT 540M | January 5, 2011 | GF108 | 40 | PCIe 2.0 x16 | 96:16:4 | 672 | 1344 | 1800 | 2.688 | 10.752 | 1024 | 28.8 | DDR3 | 128 | 12.0 (11_0) | 4.6 | 1.1 | —N/a | 258.048 | 32-35 | |
| GeForce GT 550M | January 5, 2011 | GF108 | 40 | PCIe 2.0 x16 | 96:16:4 | 740 | 1480 | 1800 | 2.96 | 11.84 | 1024 | 28.8 | DDR3 | 128 | 12.0 (11_0) | 4.6 | 1.1 | —N/a | 284.16 | 32-35 | |
| GeForce GT 555M | January 5, 2011 | GF106 GF108 | 40 | PCIe 2.0 x16 | 144:24:24; 144:24:16; 96:16:4 | 590; 650; 753 | 1180; 1300; 1506 | 1800; 1800; 3138 | 14.6; 10.4; 3 | 14.6; 15.6; 12 | 1536; 2048; 1024 | 43.2; 28.8; 50.2 | DDR3; DDR3; GDDR5 | 192; 128; 128 | 12.0 (11_0) | 4.6 | 1.1 | —N/a | 339.84; 374.4; 289.15 | 30-35 | |
| GeForce GTX 560M | May 30, 2011 | GF116 | 40 | PCIe 2.0 x16 | 192:32:16; 192:32:24 | 775 | 1550 | 2500 | 18.6 | 24.8 | 2048; 1536, 3072 | 40.0; 60.0 | GDDR5 | 128; 192 | 12.0 (11_0) | 4.6 | 1.1 | —N/a | 595.2 | 75 | |
| GeForce GTX 570M | June 28, 2011 | GF114 | 40 | PCIe 2.0 x16 | 336:56:24 | 575 | 1150 | 3000 | 13.8 | 32.2 | 1536 | 72.0 | GDDR5 | 192 | 12.0 (11_0) | 4.6 | 1.1 | —N/a | 772.8 | 75 | |
| GeForce GTX 580M | June 28, 2011 | GF114 | 40 | PCIe 2.0 x16 | 384:64:32 | 620 | 1240 | 3000 | 19.8 | 39.7 | 2048 | 96.0 | GDDR5 | 256 | 12.0 (11_0) | 4.6 | 1.1 | —N/a | 952.3 | 100 | |

== Chipset table ==
=== GeForce 500 (5xx) series ===
| Model | Launch | Code name | Fab (nm) | Transistors (million) | Die size (mm^{2}) | Bus interface | SM count | Core config (Note: Unified shaders: texture mapping units: render output units) (Note: Each SM in the GF110 contains 4 texture filtering units for every texture address unit. The complete GF110 die contains 64 texture address units and 256 texture filtering units. Each SM in the GF114/116/118 architecture contains 8 texture filtering units for every texture address unit but has doubled both addressing and filtering units.) | Clock rate | | | Fillrate | | Memory configuration | | | | Supported API version | | | | Processing power (GFLOPS) (Note: To calculate the processing power see Fermi (microarchitecture)#Performance.) | | TDP (watts) (Note: Similar to previous generation, GTX 580 and most likely future GTX 570, while reflecting its improvement over GF100, still have lower rated TDP and higher power consumption, e.g. GTX 580 (243W TDP) is slightly less power hungry than GTX 480 (250W TDP). This is managed by clock throttling through drivers when a dedicated power hungry application is identified that could breach card TDP. Application name changing will disable throttling and enable full power consumption, which in some cases could be close to that of GTX 480.) | Release price (USD) |
| Model | Launch | Code name | Fab (nm) | Transistors (million) | Die size (mm^{2}) | Bus interface | SM count | Core config | Core (MHz) | Shader (MHz) | Memory (MHz) | Pixel (GP/s) | Texture (GT/s) | Size (MB) | Bandwidth (GB/s) | DRAM type | Bus width (bit) | Vulkan | Direct3D | OpenGL | OpenCL^{8} | Single precision | Double precision | TDP (watts) | Release price (USD) |
|---|---|---|---|---|---|---|---|---|---|---|---|---|---|---|---|---|---|---|---|---|---|---|---|---|---|
| GeForce 510 | September 29, 2011 | GF119 | TSMC 40 nm | 292 | 79 | PCIe 2.0 x16 | 1 | 48:8:4 | 523 | 1046 | 1800 | 2.1 | 4.5 | 1024; 2048 | 14.4 | DDR3 | 64 | n/a | 12 (11_0) | 4.6 | 1.1 | 100.4 | Unknown | 25 | OEM |
| GeForce GT 520 | April 12, 2011 | GF119 | TSMC 40 nm | 292 | 79 | PCIe 2.0 x16 PCIe 2.0 x1 PCI | 1 | 48:8:4 | 810 | 1620 | 1800 | 3.25 | 6.5 | 1024; 2048 | 14.4 | DDR3 | 64 | n/a | 12 (11_0) | 4.6 | 1.1 | 155.5 | Unknown | 29 | 59 |
| GeForce GT 530 | May 14, 2011 | GF108-220 | TSMC 40 nm | 585 | 116 | PCIe 2.0 x16 | 2 | 96:16:4 | 700 | 1400 | 1800 | 2.8 | 11.2 | 1024; 2048 | 28.8 | DDR3 | 128 | n/a | 12 (11_0) | 4.6 | 1.1 | 268.8 | 22.40 | 50 | OEM |
| GeForce GT 545 | May 14, 2011 | GF116 | TSMC 40 nm | ~1170 | ~238 | PCIe 2.0 x16 | 3 | 144:24:16 | 720 | 1440 | 1800 | 11.52 | 17.28 | 1536; 3072 | 43 | DDR3 | 192 | n/a | 12 (11_0) | 4.6 | 1.1 | 415.07 | Unknown | 70 | 149 |
| GeForce GT 545 | May 14, 2011 | GF116 | TSMC 40 nm | ~1170 | ~238 | PCIe 2.0 x16 | 3 | 144:24:16 | 870 | 1740 | 3996 | 13.92 | 20.88 | 1024 | 64 | GDDR5 | 128 | n/a | 12 (11_0) | 4.6 | 1.1 | 501.12 | Unknown | 105 | OEM |
| GeForce GTX 550 Ti | March 15, 2011 | GF116-400 | TSMC 40 nm | ~1170 | ~238 | PCIe 2.0 x16 | 4 | 192:32:24 | 900 | 1800 | 4104 | 21.6 | 28.8 | 768+256; 1536 | 65.7+32.8; 98.5 | GDDR5 | 128+64 (Note: 1024 MB RAM on 192-bit bus assemble with 4 x (128 MB) + 2 x (256 MB).); 192 | n/a | 12 (11_0) | 4.6 | 1.1 | 691.2 | Unknown | 116 | 149 |
| GeForce GTX 555 | May 14, 2011 | GF114 | TSMC 40 nm | 1950 | 332 | PCIe 2.0 x16 | 6 | 288:48:24 | 736 | 1472 | 3828 | 17.6 | 35.3 | 1024 | 91.9 | GDDR5 | 128+64 | n/a | 12 (11_0) | 4.6 | 1.1 | 847.9 | Unknown | 150 | OEM |
| GeForce GTX 560 SE | February 20, 2012 | GF114-200-KB-A1 (Note: Internally referred to as GF104B) | TSMC 40 nm | 1950 | 332 | PCIe 2.0 x16 | 6 | 288:48:24 | 736 | 1472 | 3828 | 17.6 | 35.3 | 1024 | 91.9 | GDDR5 | 128+64 | n/a | 12 (11_0) | 4.6 | 1.1 | 847.9 | Unknown | 150 | OEM |
| GeForce GTX 560 | May 17, 2011 | GF114-325-A1 | TSMC 40 nm | 1950 | 332 | PCIe 2.0 x16 | 7 | 336:56:32 | 810 | 1620 | 4008 | 25.92 | 45.36 | 1024 2048 | 128.1 | GDDR5 | 256 | n/a | 12 (11_0) | 4.6 | 1.1 | 1088.6 | Unknown | 150 | 199 |
| GeForce GTX 560 Ti | January 25, 2011 | GF114-400-A1 | TSMC 40 nm | 1950 | 332 | PCIe 2.0 x16 | 8 | 384:64:32 | 822 | 1645 | 4008 | 26.3 | 52.61 | 1024 2048 | 128.26 | GDDR5 | 256 | n/a | 12 (11_0) | 4.6 | 1.1 | 1263.4 | 110 | 170 | 249 |
| GeForce GTX 560 Ti | May 30, 2011 | GF110 (Note: Internally referred to as GF100B) | TSMC 40 nm | 3000 | 520 | PCIe 2.0 x16 | 11 | 352:44:40 | 732 | 1464 | 3800 | 29.28 | 32.21 | 1280; 2560 | 152 | GDDR5 | 320 | n/a | 12 (11_0) | 4.6 | 1.1 | 1030.7 | 128.83 | 210 | OEM |
| GeForce GTX 560 Ti 448 Cores | November 29, 2011 | GF110-270-A1 | TSMC 40 nm | 3000 | 520 | PCIe 2.0 x16 | 14 | 448:56:40 | 732 | 1464 | 3800 | 29.28 | 40.99 | 1280 | 152 | GDDR5 | 320 | n/a | 12 (11_0) | 4.6 | 1.1 | 1311.7 | 163.97 | 210 | 289 |
| GeForce GTX 570 | December 7, 2010 | GF110-275-A1 | TSMC 40 nm | 3000 | 520 | PCIe 2.0 x16 | 15 | 480:60:40 | 732 | 1464 | 3800 | 29.28 | 43.92 | 1280 2560 | 152 | GDDR5 | 320 | n/a | 12 (11_0) | 4.6 | 1.1 | 1405.4 | 175.68 | 219 | 349 |
| GeForce GTX 580 | November 9, 2010 | GF110-375-A1 | TSMC 40 nm | 3000 | 520 | PCIe 2.0 x16 | 16 | 512:64:48 | 772 | 1544 | 4008 | 37.05 | 49.41 | 1536; 3072 (Note: Some companies have announced that they will be offering the GTX 580 with 3GB RAM.) | 192.384 | GDDR5 | 384 | n/a | 12 (11_0) | 4.6 | 1.1 | 1581.1 | 197.63 | 244 | 499 |
| GeForce GTX 590 | March 24, 2011 | 2x GF110-351-A1 | TSMC 40 nm | 2x 3000 | 2x 520 | PCIe 2.0 x16 | 2x16 | 2x 512:64:48 | 607 | 1215 | 3414 | 2x29.14 | 2x38.85 | 2x 1536 | 2x163.87 | GDDR5 | 2x384 | n/a | 12 (11_0) | 4.6 | 1.1 | 2488.3 | 311.04 | 365 | 699 |
| Model | Launch | Code name | Fab (nm) | Transistors (million) | Die size (mm^{2}) | Bus interface | SM count | Core config | Clock rate | | | Fillrate | | Memory configuration | | | | Supported API version | | | | Processing power (GFLOPS) | | TDP (Watts) | Release price (USD) |
| Model | Launch | Code name | Fab (nm) | Transistors (million) | Die size (mm^{2}) | Bus interface | SM count | Core config | Core (MHz) | Shader (MHz) | Memory (MHz) | Pixel (GP/s) | Texture (GT/s) | Size (MB) | Bandwidth (GB/s) | DRAM type | Bus width (bit) | Vulkan | Direct3D | OpenGL | OpenCL^{8} | Single precision | Double precision | TDP (Watts) | Release price (USD) |

== Support ==
Nvidia announced that after Release 390 drivers, it will no longer release 32-bit drivers for 32-bit operating systems.

Nvidia announced in April 2018 that Fermi will transition to legacy driver support status and be maintained until January 2019.

== Counterfeit usage ==
The cards of this generation, particularly the smaller length 550 Ti model, are common cards of choice by counterfeit resellers, who take the cards and illicitly modify the firmware to have them report as more modern cards such as the GTX 1060 and 1050 Ti models. These cards are then sold via eBay, Taobao, Aliexpress and Wish.com by scammers. They may have a minimum of functionality to ensure at a first glance they appear legitimate, but defects caused by the fake BIOS, manufacturing and software issues will almost always cause crashes in modern games and applications, and if not, the performance will still be extremely poor.

== See also ==
- GeForce 200 series
- GeForce 400 series
- GeForce 600 series
- GeForce 700 series
- GeForce 800M series
- GeForce 900 series
- GeForce 10 series
- Nvidia Quadro
- Nvidia Tesla

== Notes ==
- David Kanter (September 30, 2009). "Inside Fermi: Nvidia's HPC Push". realworldtech.com.
