= GeForce 700 series =

Series of GPUs by Nvidia

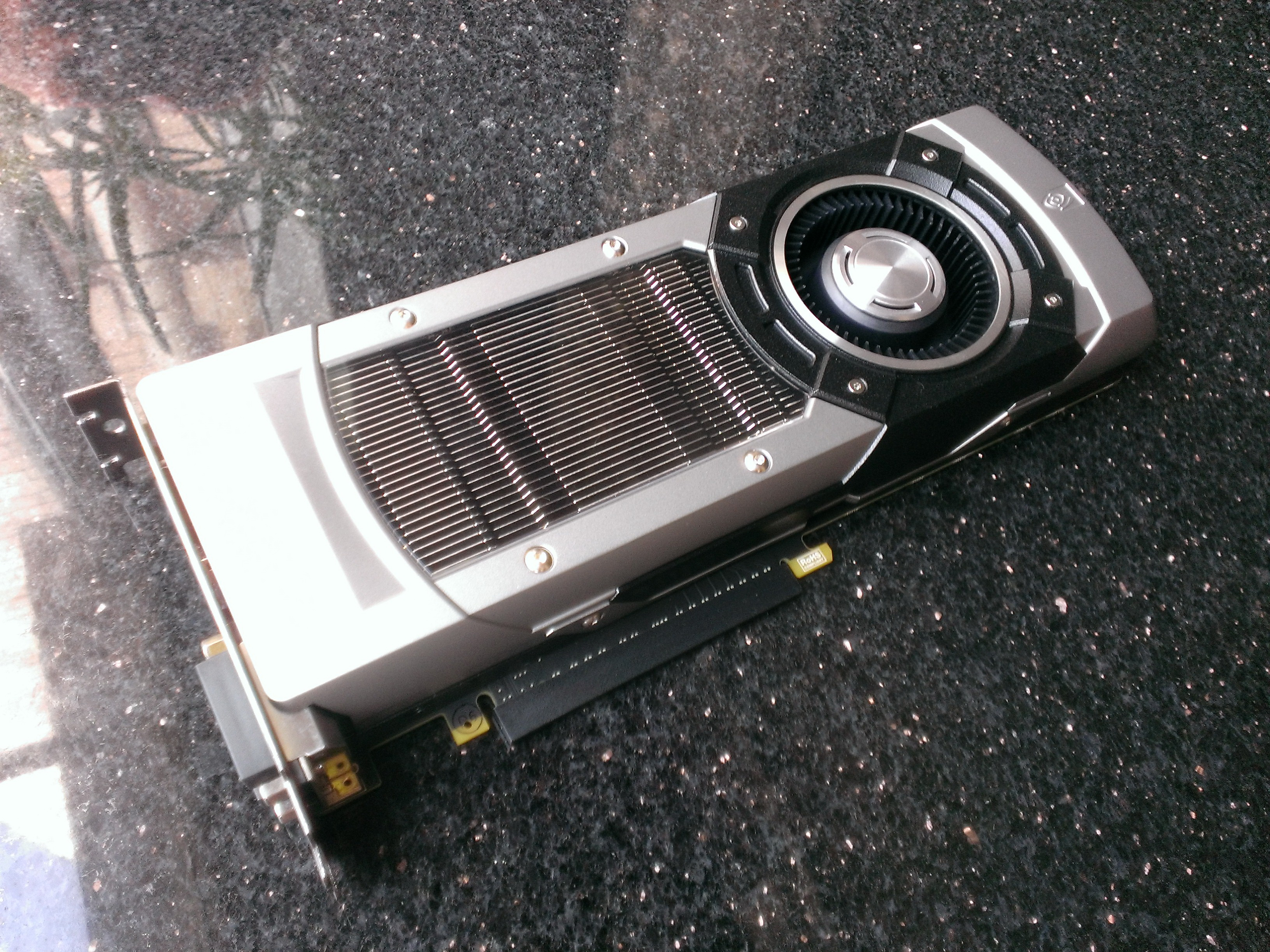
- Top: Logo of the series Bottom: A GeForce GTX Titan released in 2013, the series' lowest-end Titan model
- Release date: February 19, 2013; 13 years ago
- Codename: GK110; GK208; GM108; GM107
- Architecture: Fermi; Kepler; Maxwell
- Models: GeForce series: GeForce GT series; GeForce GTX series
- Transistors: 292M (GF119) 40 nm; 585M (GF117) 28 nm; 1.02B (GK208) 28 nm; 1.27B (GK107) 28 nm; 2.54B (GK106) 28 nm; 3.54B (GK104) 28 nm; 7.08B (GK110) 28 nm
- Fabrication process: TSMC 40 nm; TSMC 28 nm

Cards
- Entry-level: GeForce GT 705; GeForce GT 710; GeForce GT 720; GeForce GT 730; GeForce GT 740; GeForce GTX 745
- Mid-range: GeForce GTX 750; GeForce GTX 750 Ti; GeForce GTX 760; GeForce GTX 760 Ti; GeForce GTX 770
- High-end: GeForce GTX 780
- Enthusiast: GeForce GTX 780 Ti; Nvidia Titan; Nvidia Titan Black; Nvidia Titan Z

API support
- OpenCL: OpenCL 3.0 (Note: In OpenCL 3.0, OpenCL 1.2 functionality has become a mandatory baseline, while all OpenCL 2.x and OpenCL 3.0 features were made optional.)
- OpenGL: OpenGL 4.6
- Vulkan: Vulkan 1.2 (Kepler); Vulkan 1.4 (Maxwell); SPIR-V
- DirectX: Direct3D 12.0 (feature level 11_0) Shader Model 6.7 (Maxwell), Shader Model 6.5 (Kepler) or Shader Model 5.1 (Fermi)

History
- Predecessor: GeForce 600 series
- Variant: GeForce 800M series
- Successor: GeForce 900 series

Support status
- Fermi and Kepler unsupported. Maxwell Game-ready Driver support ended in November 2025 and security updates continued until October 2028.

The GeForce 700 series is a series of graphics processing units developed by Nvidia. While mainly a refresh of the Kepler microarchitecture (GK-codenamed chips), some cards use Fermi (GF) and later cards use Maxwell (GM). GeForce 700 series cards were first released in 2013, starting with the release of the GeForce GTX Titan on February 19, 2013, followed by the GeForce GTX 780 on May 23, 2013. The first mobile GeForce 700 series chips were released in April 2013.

== Overview ==
GK110 was designed and marketed with computational performance in mind. It contains 7.1 billion transistors. This model also attempts to maximise energy efficiency through the execution of as many tasks as possible in parallel according to the capabilities of its streaming processors.

With GK110, increases in memory space and bandwidth for both the register file and the L2 cache over previous models, are seen. At the SMX level, GK110's register file space has increased to 256KB composed of 64K 32bit registers, as compared to Fermi's 32K 32bit registers totaling 128 KB. As for the L2 cache, GK110 L2 cache space increased by up to 1.5MB, 2x as big as GF110. Both the L2 cache and register file bandwidth have also doubled. Performance in register-starved scenarios has also improved as more registers are available for each thread. This goes hand in hand with an increase in the total number of registers each thread can address, moving from 63 registers per thread to 255 registers per thread with GK110.

With GK110, Nvidia also reworked the GPU texture cache to be used for compute. With 48KB in size, in compute the texture cache becomes a read-only cache, specializing in unaligned memory access workloads. Furthermore, error detection capabilities have been added to make it safer for use with workloads that rely on ECC.

Dynamic Super Resolution (DSR) was added to Kepler GPUs with the latest Nvidia drivers.

== Architecture ==
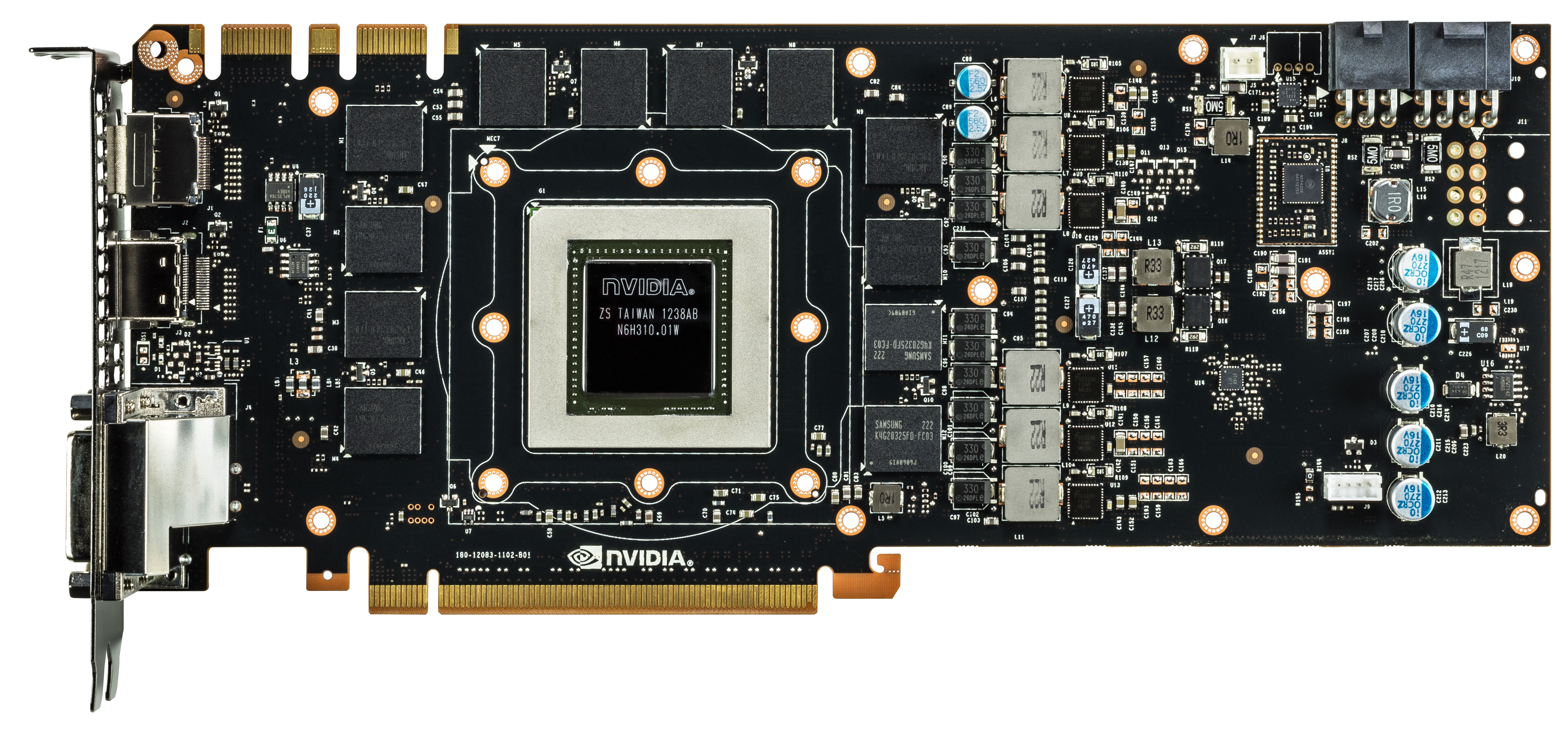
GeForce GTX 780 PCB and die

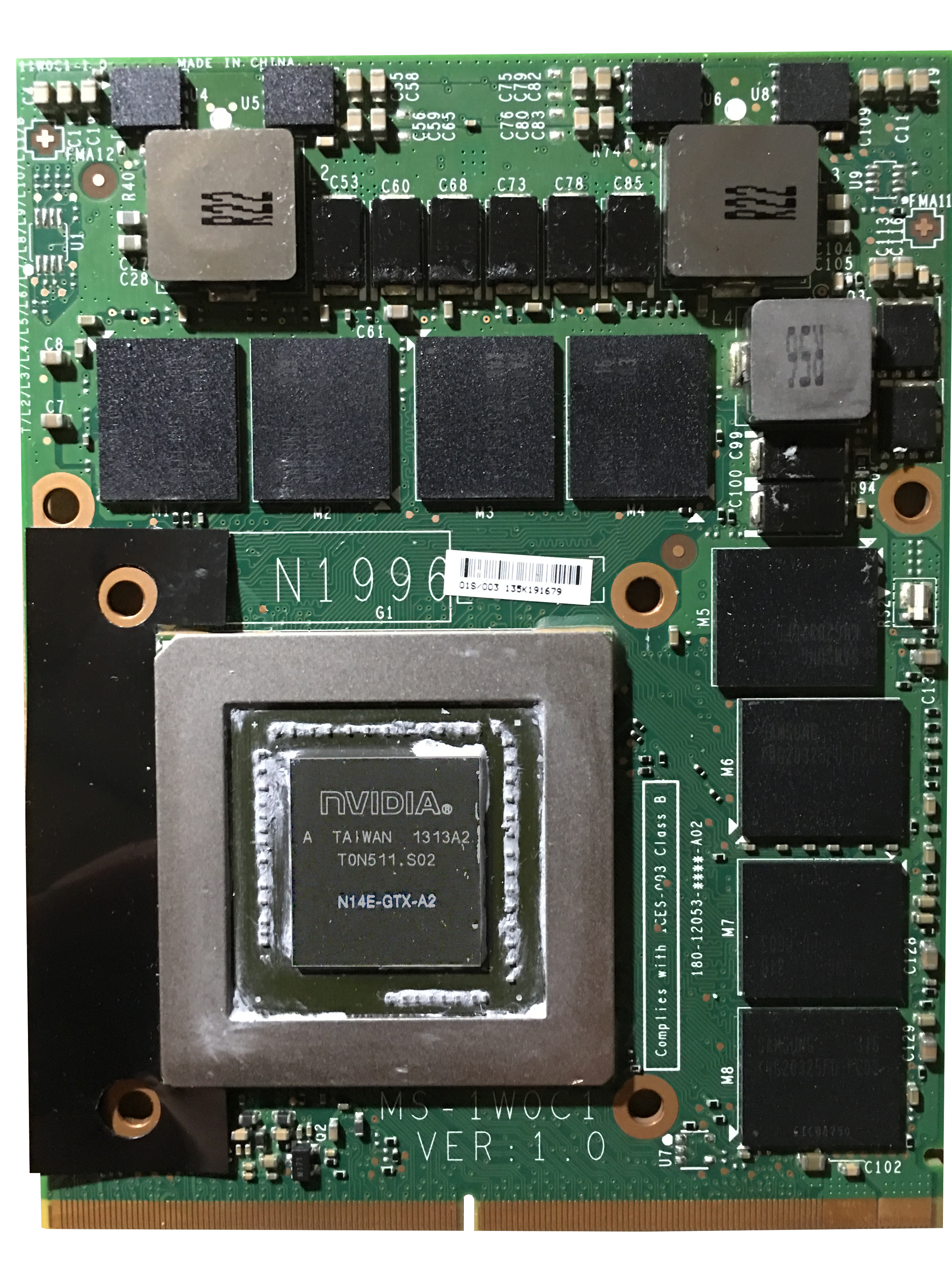
A GTX 780M GPU with MXM connector

The GeForce 700 series contains features from both GK104 and GK110. Kepler based members of the 700 series add the following standard features to the GeForce family.

Derived from GK104:

- PCI Express 3.0 interface
- DisplayPort 1.2
- HDMI 1.4a 4K x 2K video output
- Purevideo VP5 hardware video acceleration (up to 4K x 2K H.264 decode)
- Hardware H.264 encoding acceleration block (NVENC)
- Support for up to 4 independent 2D displays, or 3 stereoscopic/3D displays (NV Surround)
- Bindless Textures
- GPU Boost
- TXAA
- Manufactured by TSMC on a 28 nm process

New Features from GK110:

- Compute Focus SMX Improvement
- CUDA Compute Capability 3.5
- New Shuffle Instructions
- Dynamic Parallelism
- Hyper-Q (Hyper-Q's MPI functionality reserve for Tesla only)
- Grid Management Unit
- Nvidia GPUDirect (GPU Direct's RDMA functionality reserve for Tesla & Quadro only)
- GPU-Boost 2.0

=== Compute focus SMX improvement ===
With GK110, Nvidia opted to increase computational performance. The single biggest change from GK104 is that rather than 8 dedicated FP64 CUDA cores, GK110 has up to 64, giving it 8x the FP64 throughput of a GK104 SMX. The SMX also sees an increase in space for register file. Register file space has increased to 256KB compared to Fermi. The texture cache are also improved. With a 48KB space, the texture cache can become a read-only cache for compute workloads.

=== New shuffle Instructions ===
At a low level, GK110 sees additional instructions and operations to further improve performance. New shuffle instructions allow for threads within a warp to share data without going back to memory, making the process much quicker than the previous load/share/store method. Atomic operations are also overhauled, speeding up the execution speed of atomic operations and adding some FP64 operations that were previously only available for FP32 data.

=== Hyper-Q ===
Hyper-Q expands GK110 hardware work queues from 1 to 32. The significance of this being that having a single work queue meant that Fermi could be under occupied at times as there wasn't enough work in that queue to fill every SM. By having 32 work queues, GK110 can in many scenarios, achieve higher utilization by being able to put different task streams on what would otherwise be an idle SMX. The simple nature of Hyper-Q is further reinforced by the fact that it's easily map to MPI, a common message passing interface frequently used in HPC. As legacy MPI-based algorithms that were originally designed for multi-CPU systems that became bottlenecked by false dependencies now have a solution. By increasing the number of MPI jobs, it's possible to utilize Hyper-Q on these algorithms to improve the efficiency all without changing the code itself.

=== Microsoft DirectX support ===
Nvidia Kepler GPUs of the GeForce 700 series fully support DirectX 11.0. All GeForce 700 series card also support DirectX 12.0 with feature level 11_0.

=== Dynamic parallelism ===
Dynamic parallelism ability is for kernels to be able to dispatch other kernels. With Fermi, only the CPU could dispatch a kernel, which incurs a certain amount of overhead by having to communicate back to the CPU. By giving kernels the ability to dispatch their own child kernels, GK110 can both save time by not having to go back to the CPU, and in the process free up the CPU to work on other tasks.

== Products ==
=== GeForce 700 (7xx) series ===
The GeForce 700 series was designed for desktop architecture. Cheaper and lower performing products were expected to be released over time. Kepler supports 11.1 features with 11_0 feature level through the DirectX 11.1 API, however Nvidia did not enable four non-gaming features in Hardware in Kepler (for 11_1).

- ^{1} Shader Processors : Texture mapping units : Render output units
- ^{2} Pixel fillrate is calculated as the number of ROPs multiplied by the base core clock speed
- ^{3} Texture fillrate is calculated as the number of TMUs multiplied by the base core clock speed.
- ^{4} Single precision performance is calculated as 2 times the number of shaders multiplied by the base core clock speed.
- ^{5} Double precision performance of the GTX Titan and GTX Titan Black is either 1/3 or 1/24 of single-precision performance depending on a user-selected configuration option in the driver that boosts single-precision performance if double-precision is set to 1/24 of single-precision performance, while other Kepler chips' double precision performance is fixed at 1/24 of single-precision performance. GeForce 700 series Maxwell chips' double precision performance is 1/32 of single-precision performance.
- ^{6} SLI supports connecting up to 4 identical graphics cards for a 4-way SLI configuration. Those supporting 4-way SLI can support 3-way & 2-way SLI, however a dual-GPU card already implements 2-way SLI internally, thus only 2 dual-GPU cards can be used in SLI to give a 4-way SLI configuration.

=== GeForce 700M (7xxM) series ===
Some implementations may use different specifications.

- ^{1} Unified shaders : Texture mapping units : Render output units

Model	Launch	Code name	Fab (nm)	Bus interface	Core config^{1}	Clock speed			Fillrate		Memory				Supported API version				Processing power^{2} (GFLOPS)	TDP (watts)	Notes
Model	Launch	Code name	Fab (nm)	Bus interface	Core config^{1}	Core (MHz)	Shader (MHz)	Memory (MT/s)	Pixel (GP/s)	Texture (GT/s)	Size (MB)	Bandwidth (GB/s)	Type	Bus width (bit)	Direct3D	OpenGL	OpenCL	Vulkan (Note: Kepler supports Vulkan version 1.2, Fermi does not support the Vulkan API at all.)	Processing power^{2} (GFLOPS)	TDP (watts)	Notes
GeForce 705M	June 1, 2013	GF119 (Note: Lacks hardware video encoder)	40	PCIe 2.0 x16	48:8:4	775	1550	1800	1.48	5.9	up to 2048	?	DDR3	64	12.0 (11_0)	4.6	1.1	n/a	141.7	12	Rebadged 520M
GeForce 710M	April 1, 2013	GF117	28	PCIe 2.0 x16	96:16:4	775	1550	1800	3.1	12.4	up to 2048	14.4	DDR3	64	12.0 (11_0)	4.6	1.1	n/a	297.6	15	
GeForce GT 720M	April 1, 2013	GF117	28	PCIe 2.0 x16	96:16:4	800	1600	1600	2.5	10	up to 2048	12.8	DDR3	64	12.0 (11_0)	4.6	1.1	n/a	240	33	
GeForce GT 720M	December 25, 2013	GK208	28	PCIe 2.0 x16	192:16:8	800	800	1600	2.9	11.5	up to 2048	12.8	DDR3	64	12.0 (11_0)	4.6	1.2	1.2	276	33	
GeForce GT 730M	April 1, 2013	GK107	28	PCIe 3.0 x16	384:32:16	725	725	1800	5.8	23	up to 2048	14.4 – 64.0	DDR3 GDDR5	128	12.0 (11_0)	4.6	1.1	1.2	552.2	33	
GeForce GT 730M	March 6, 2014	GK208	28	PCIe 2.0 x8	384:16:8	725	725	1800	5.8	11.5	up to 2048	14.4 – 64.0	DDR3 GDDR5	64	12.0 (11_0)	4.6	1.1	1.2	552.2	33	
GeForce GT 735M	April 1, 2013	GK208	28	PCIe 2.0 x8	384:32:8	889	889	2000	4.6	9.2	up to 2048	16.0	DDR3	64	12.0 (11_0)	4.6	1.2	1.2	441.6	33	
GeForce GT 740M	April 1, 2013	GK107	28	PCIe 3.0 x16	384:32:16	810-1033	810-1033	1800/3600	6.48	25.9	up to 2048	14.4 – 57.6	DDR3 GDDR5	128	12.0 (11_0)	4.6	1.1	1.2	622.1	45	
GeForce GT 740M	June 20, 2013	GK208	28	PCIe 3.0 x8	384:32:8	980-1033	980-1033	1800/3600	8.3	33.1	up to 2048	14.4 – 57.6	DDR3 GDDR5	64	12.0 (11_0)	4.6	1.2	1.2	752.6	33	
GeForce GT 745M	April 1, 2013	GK107	28	PCIe 3.0 x16	384:32:16	837	837	2000 – 5000	4.39	17.6	up to 2048	32.0 – 80.0	DDR3 GDDR5	128	12.0 (11_0)	4.6	1.2	1.2	642.8	45	
GeForce GT 750M	April 1, 2013	GK107	28	PCIe 3.0 x16	384:32:16	967	967	2000 – 5000	7.53	30.1	up to 4096	32 – 80	DDR3 GDDR5	128	12.0 (11_0)	4.6	1.1	1.2	722.7	50	
GeForce GT 755M	Unknown	GK107	28	PCIe 3.0 x16	384:32:16	1020	1020	5400	15.7	31.4	up to 2048	86.4	GDDR5	128	12.0 (11_0)	4.6	1.1	1.2	752.6	50	
GeForce GTX 760M	May 30, 2013	GK106	28	PCIe 3.0 x16	768:64:16	657	657	4008	10	40.2	2048	64.1	GDDR5	128	12.0 (11_0)	4.6	1.1	1.2	964.6	55	
GeForce GTX 765M	May 30, 2013	GK106	28	PCIe 3.0 x16	768:64:16	850	850	4008	12.8	51	2048	64.1	GDDR5	128	12.0 (11_0)	4.6	1.2	1.2	1224	75	
GeForce GTX 770M	May 30, 2013	GK106	28	PCIe 3.0 x16	960:80:24	811	811	4008	14.1	56.5	3072	96.2	GDDR5	192	12.0 (11_0)	4.6	1.2	1.2	1356	75	
GeForce GTX 780M	May 30, 2013	GK104	28	PCIe 3.0 x16	1536:128:32	823	823	5000	24.7	98.7	4096	160.0	GDDR5	256	12.0 (11_0)	4.6	1.2	1.2	2369	100	

== Chipset table ==
=== GeForce 700 (7xx) series ===
Model	Launch	Code name	Fab (nm)	Transistors (million)	Die size (mm^{2})	Bus interface	SMX count	Core config (Note: Unified shaders: texture mapping units: render output units)	Clock rate				Fillrate		Memory configuration				Supported API version				Processing power (GFLOPS) (Note: To calculate the processing power see Maxwell (microarchitecture)#Performance, or Kepler (microarchitecture)#Performance.)		TDP (Watts)	Release price (USD)
Model	Launch	Code name	Fab (nm)	Transistors (million)	Die size (mm^{2})	Bus interface	SMX count	Core config	Base (MHz)	Average Boost (MHz)	Max Boost (Note: Max Boost depends on ASIC quality. For example, some GTX TITAN with over 80% ASIC quality can hit 1019 MHz by default, lower ASIC quality will be 1006 MHz or 993 MHz.) (MHz)	Memory (MHz)	Pixel (GP/s)	Texture (GT/s)	Size (MB)	Bandwidth (GB/s)	DRAM type	Bus width (bit)	Vulkan (Note: Maxwell supports Vulkan version 1.4, while Kepler only support Vulkan version 1.2, Fermi does not support the Vulkan API at all.)	Direct3D (Note: Kepler supports some optional 11.1 features on feature level 11_0 through the Direct3D 11.1 API, however Nvidia did not enable four non-gaming features to qualify Kepler for level 11_1.)	OpenGL	OpenCL	Single precision	Double precision	TDP (Watts)	Release price (USD)
GeForce GT 705 (Note: The GeForce GT 705 (OEM) is a rebranded GeForce GT 610, which itself is a rebranded GeForce GT 520.)	March 27, 2014	GF119-300-A1	TSMC 40 nm	292	79	PCIe 2.0 x16	1	48:8:4	810	—N/a	—N/a	898 (1796)	3.24	6.5	512; 1024	14.4	DDR3	64	n/a	12 (11_0)	4.6	1.1	155.5	19.4	29	OEM
GeForce GT 710	March 27, 2014	GK208-301-A1	TSMC 28 nm	1020	79	PCIe 2.0 x8	1	192:16:8	823	—N/a	—N/a	900 (1800)	6.6	13.2	512	14.4	DDR3	64	1.2	12 (11_0)	4.6	1.2	316.0	13.2		OEM
GeForce GT 710	January 26, 2016	GK208-203-B1	TSMC 28 nm	1020	79	PCIe 2.0 x8, PCIe x1	1	192:16:8	954	—N/a	—N/a	900 (1800); 1253 (5010)	7.6	15.3	1024; 2048	14.4; 40.0	DDR3; GDDR5	64	1.2	12 (11_0)	4.6	1.2	366	15.3	19	35–45
GeForce GT 720	March 27, 2014	GK208-201-B1	TSMC 28 nm	1020	79	PCIe 2.0 x8	1	192:16:8	797	—N/a	—N/a	900 (1800); 1253 (5010)	6.4	12.8	1024; 2048	14.4; 40.0	DDR3; GDDR5	64	1.2	12 (11_0)	4.6	1.2	306	12.8	19	49–59
GeForce GT 730 (Note: The GeForce GT 730 (DDR3, 64-bit) is a rebranded GeForce GT 630 (Rev. 2).) (Note: The GeForce GT 730 (DDR3, 128-bit) is a rebranded GeForce GT 630 (128-bit).)	June 18, 2014	GK208-301-A1	TSMC 28 nm	1020	79	PCIe 2.0 x8	2	384:16:8	902	—N/a	—N/a	900 (1800)	7.22	14.44	1024; 2048; 4096	14.4	DDR3	64	1.2	12 (11_0)	4.6	1.2	692.7	28.9	23	69–79
GeForce GT 730	June 18, 2014	GK208-400-A1	TSMC 28 nm	1020	79	PCIe 2.0 x8	2	384:16:8	902	—N/a	—N/a	1250 (5000)	7.22	14.44	1024; 2048	40.0	GDDR5	64	1.2	12 (11_0)	4.6	1.2	692.7	28.9	25	69–79
GeForce GT 730	June 18, 2014	GF108	TSMC 40 nm	585	116	PCIe 2.0 x16	2	96:16:4	700	—N/a	—N/a	900 (1800)	2.8	11.0	1024; 2048; 4096	28.8	DDR3	128	n/a	12 (11_0)	4.6	1.1	268.8	33.6	49	69–79
GeForce GT 740 (Note: The GeForce GT 740 (OEM) is a rebranded GeForce GTX 650.)	May 29, 2014	GK107-425-A2	TSMC; 28HP	1270	118	PCIe 3.0 x16	2	384:32:16	993	—N/a	—N/a	891 (1782)	15.9	31.8	1024; 2048; 4096	28.5	DDR3	128	1.2	12 (11_0)	4.6	1.2	762.6	31.8	64	89–99
GeForce GT 740	May 29, 2014	GK107-425-A2	TSMC; 28HP	1270	118	PCIe 3.0 x16	2	384:32:16	993	—N/a	—N/a	1252 (5008)	15.9	31.8	1024; 2048; 4096	80.1	GDDR5	128	1.2	12 (11_0)	4.6	1.2	762.6	31.8	64	89–99
GeForce GTX 745	February 18, 2014	GM107-220-A2	TSMC; 28HP	1870	148	PCIe 3.0 x16	3	384:24:16	1033	Unknown	Unknown	900 (1800)	16.5	24.8	1024; 4096	28.8	DDR3	128	1.4	12 (11_0)	4.6	1.2	793.3	24.8	55	OEM
GeForce GTX 750	February 18, 2014	GM107-300-A2	TSMC; 28HP	1870	148	PCIe 3.0 x16	4	512:32:16	1020	1085	1163	1250 (5000)	16.3	32.6	1024; 2048; 4096	80	GDDR5	128	1.4	12 (11_0)	4.6	1.2	1044.5	32.6	55	119
GeForce GTX 750 Ti	February 18, 2014	GM107-400-A2	TSMC; 28HP	1870	148	PCIe 3.0 x16	5	640:40:16	1020	1085	1200	1350 (5400)	16.3	40.8	1024; 2048; 4096	86.4	GDDR5	128	1.4	12 (11_0)	4.6	1.2	1305.6	40.8	60	149
GeForce GTX 760 192-bit	October 17, 2013	GK104-200-KD-A2	TSMC; 28HP	3540	294	PCIe 3.0 x16	6	1152:96:24	824	888	889	1450 (5800)	19.8	79.1	1536; 3072	139.2	GDDR5	192	1.2	12 (11_0)	4.6	1.2	1896.2	79.0	130	OEM
GeForce GTX 760	June 25, 2013	GK104-225-A2	TSMC; 28HP	3540	294	PCIe 3.0 x16	6	1152:96:32	980	1033	1124	1502 (6008)	31.4 (Note: As a Kepler GPC is able to rasterize 8 pixels per clock, fully enabled GK110 GPUs (780 Ti/TITAN Black) can only output 40 pixels per clock (5 GPCs), despite 48 ROPs and all SMX units being physically present. For GTX 780 and GTX 760, multiple GPC configurations with differing pixel fillrate are possible, depending on which SMXs were disabled in the chip: 5/4 GPCs, or 4/3 GPCs, respectively.)	94	2048; 4096	192.3	GDDR5	256	1.2	12 (11_0)	4.6	1.2	2257.9	94.1	170	249 (219)
GeForce GTX 760 Ti (Note: The GeForce GTX 760 Ti (OEM) is a rebranded GeForce GTX 670.)	September 27, 2013	GK104	TSMC; 28HP	3540	294	PCIe 3.0 x16	7	1344:112:32	915	980	1084	1502 (6008)	29.3	102.5	2048	192.3	GDDR5	256	1.2	12 (11_0)	4.6	1.2	2459.5	102.5	170	OEM
GeForce GTX 770	May 30, 2013	GK104-425-A2	TSMC; 28HP	3540	294	PCIe 3.0 x16	8	1536:128:32	1046	1085	1130	1752.5 (7010)	33.5	134	2048 4096	224	GDDR5	256	1.2	12 (11_0)	4.6	1.2	3213.3	133.9	230	399 (329)
GeForce GTX 780	May 23, 2013	GK110-300-A1	TSMC; 28HP	7080	561	PCIe 3.0 x16	12	2304:192:48	863	900	1002	1502 (6008)	41.4	160.5	3072 6144	288.4	GDDR5	384	1.2	12 (11_0)	4.6	1.2	3976.7	165.7	230	649 (499)
GeForce GTX 780 Ti	November 7, 2013	GK110-425-B1	TSMC; 28HP	7080	561	PCIe 3.0 x16	15	2880:240:48	876	928	1019	1752.5 (7010)	42.0	210.2	3072	336.5	GDDR5	384	1.2	12 (11_0)	4.6	1.2	5045.7	210.2	230	699
GeForce GTX TITAN	February 21, 2013	GK110-400-A1	TSMC; 28HP	7080	561	PCIe 3.0 x16	14	2688:224:48	837	876	993	1502 (6008)	40.2	187.5	6144	288.4	GDDR5	384	1.2	12 (11_0)	4.6	1.2	4499.7	1300-1499.9	230	999
GeForce GTX TITAN Black	February 18, 2014	GK110-430-B1	TSMC; 28HP	7080	561	PCIe 3.0 x16	15	2880:240:48	889	980	1058	1752.5 (7010)	42.7	213.4	6144	336.5	GDDR5	384	1.2	12 (11_0)	4.6	1.2	5120.6	1706.9	230	999
GeForce GTX TITAN Z	May 28, 2014	2x GK110-350-B1	TSMC; 28HP	2x 7080	2x 561	PCIe 3.0 x16	2x 15	2x 2880:240:48	705	876	Unknown	1752.5 (7010)	2x 33.8	2x 169	2x 6144	2x 336.5	GDDR5	2x 384	1.2	12 (11_0)	4.5	1.2	5046x2	1682x2	375	2999
Model	Launch	Code name	Fab (nm)	Transistors (million)	Die size (mm^{2})	Bus interface	SMX count	Core config	Clock rate				Fillrate		Memory configuration				Supported API version				Processing power (GFLOPS)		TDP (Watts)	Release price (USD)
Model	Launch	Code name	Fab (nm)	Transistors (million)	Die size (mm^{2})	Bus interface	SMX count	Core config	Base (MHz)	Average Boost (MHz)	Max Boost (MHz)	Memory (MHz)	Pixel (GP/s)	Texture (GT/s)	Size (MB)	Bandwidth (GB/s)	DRAM type	Bus width (bit)	Vulkan	Direct3D	OpenGL	OpenCL	Single precision	Double precision	TDP (Watts)	Release price (USD)

== Support ==
Nvidia GeForce GTX 760. This particular model was manufactured by Nvidia board-partner, EVGA.

Nvidia stopped releasing 32-bit drivers for 32-bit operating systems after the last Release 390.x driver, 391.35, was released in March 2018.

Kepler notebook GPUs moved to legacy support in April 2019 and stopped receiving security updates in April 2020. All notebook GPUs from the 7xxM family were affected by this change.

Nvidia announced that after Release 470 drivers, it would transition driver support for the Windows 7 and Windows 8.1 operating systems to legacy status and continue to provide critical security updates for these operating systems through September 2024.

Nvidia announced that all remaining Kepler desktop GPUs would transition to legacy support from September 2021 onwards and be supported for critical security updates through September 2024. The Nvidia GeForce GTX 745, 750 and 750 Ti from the 7xx desktop GPU family would not be affected by this change.

In Windows, the last driver to fully support CUDA with 64-Bit Compute Capability 3.5 for Kepler in Windows 7 and Windows 8.1 64-bit is 388.71, tested with latest CUDA-Z and GPU-Z, after that driver, the 64-Bit CUDA support becomes broken for GeForce 700 series GK110 with Kepler architecture.

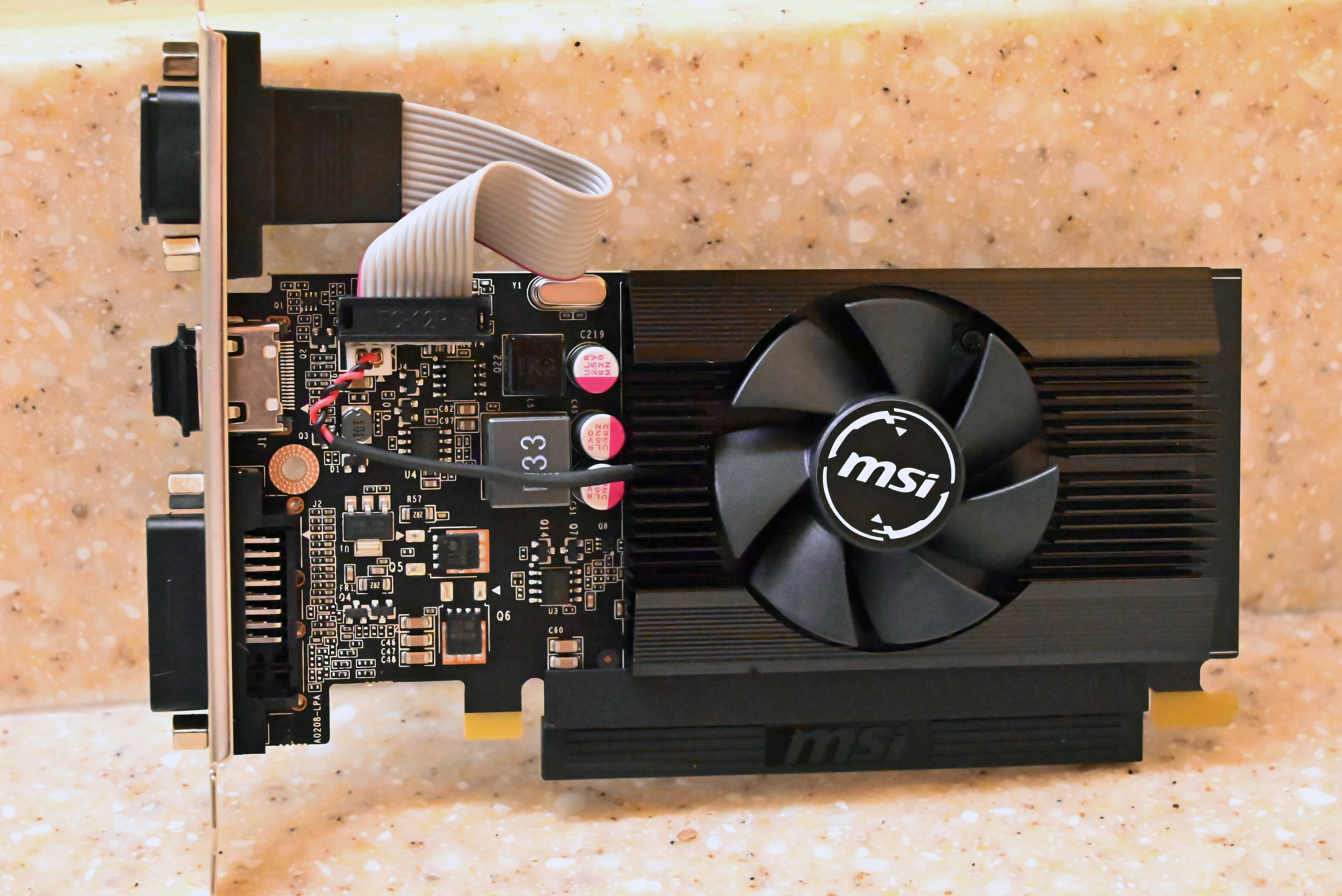
MSI low-profile GeForce 710

The last driver where monitor type detection is working properly on Windows XP is 352.86.

In December 2025, Nvidia discontinued Game Ready Driver support for the Maxwell, Pascal, and Volta architectures, which includes the Maxwell based models of the GeForce 700 series. Security updates are scheduled to be continued until October 2028, as per Nvidia. On July 1, 2025, Nvidia announced that driver branch 580 will be the last to support these architectures.

== See also ==
- GeForce 400 series
- GeForce 500 series
- GeForce 10 series
- Nvidia Quadro
- Nvidia Tesla
