= GeForce 800M series =

Series of GPUs by Nvidia

- Release date: March 12, 2014; 12 years ago
- Codename: GF117; GK104; GM10x
- Architecture: Fermi; Kepler; Maxwell
- Models: GeForce series: GeForce GTX series
- Transistors: 585M (GF117): 1.02B (GK208); 1.87B (GM107); 3.54B (GK104)
- Fabrication process: TSMC 28 nm

Cards
- Entry-level: GeForce 800M; GeForce 820M; GeForce 825M; GeForce 830M; GeForce 840M; GeForce 845M
- Mid-range: GeForce GTX 850M; GeForce GTX 860M
- High-end: GeForce GTX 870M; GeForce GTX 880M

API support
- Direct3D: Direct3D 12.0 (feature level 11_0) Shader Model 6.7 (Maxwell), Shader Model 6.5 (Kepler) or Shader Model 5.1 (Fermi)
- OpenCL: OpenCL 3.0 (Note: In OpenCL 3.0, OpenCL 1.2 functionality has become a mandatory baseline, while all OpenCL 2.x and OpenCL 3.0 features were made optional.)
- OpenGL: OpenGL 4.6
- Vulkan: Vulkan 1.2 (Kepler); Vulkan 1.4 (Maxwell); SPIR-V

History
- Predecessor: GeForce 600 series
- Variant: GeForce 700 series
- Successor: GeForce 900 series

Support status
- Fermi and Kepler unsupported. Maxwell limited support until October 2025 and security updates until October 2028.

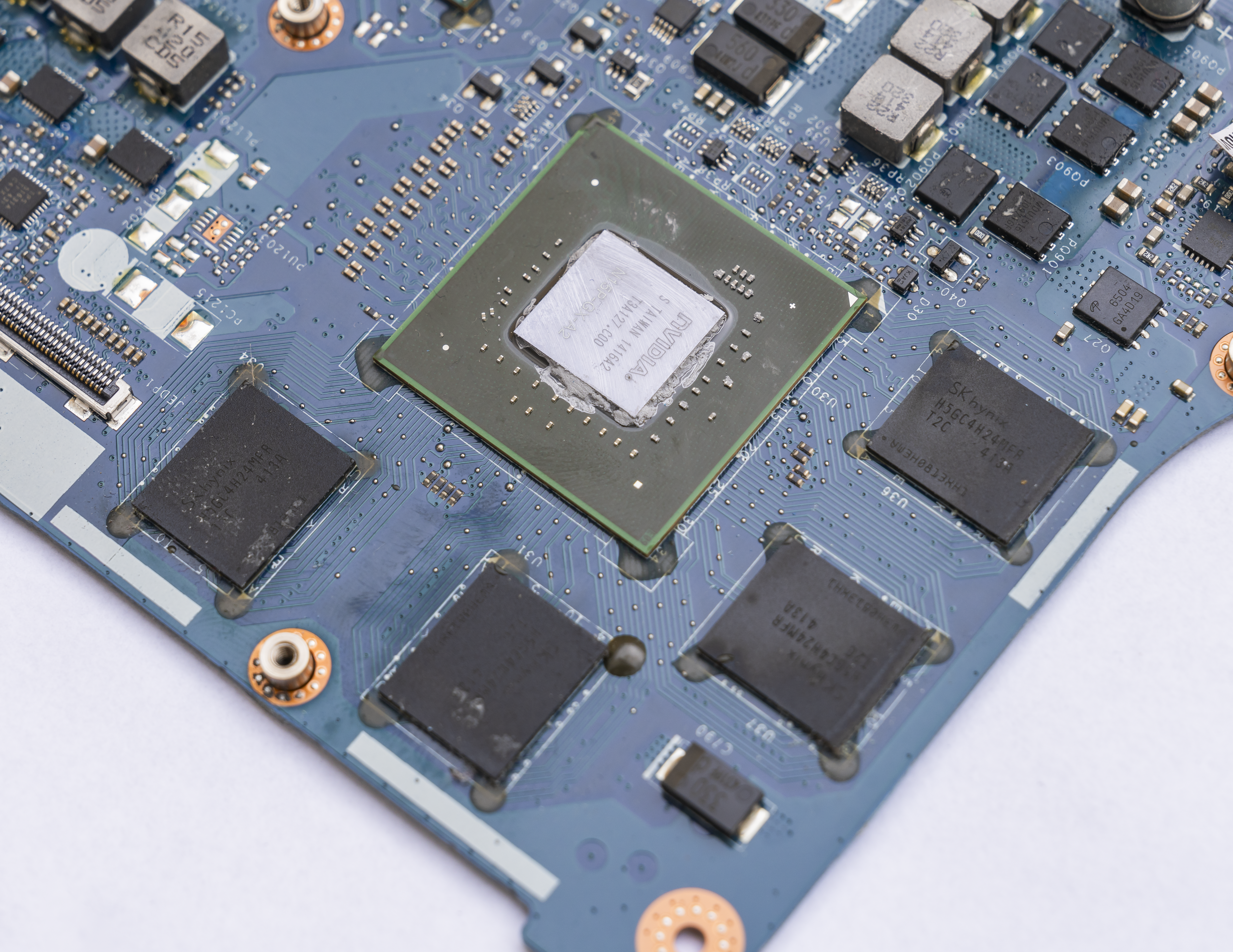
Nvidia N15P-GX-A2 GPU of the GeForce 860M with its VRAM

The GeForce 800M series is a family of graphics processing units by Nvidia for laptop PCs. It consists of rebrands of mobile versions of the GeForce 700 series and some newer chips that are lower end compared to the rebrands.

The GeForce 800 series name was originally planned to be used for both desktop and mobile chips based on the Maxwell microarchitecture (GM-codenamed chips), named after the Scottish theoretical physicist James Clerk Maxwell, which was previously introduced into the GeForce 700 series in the GTX 750 and GTX 750 Ti, released on February 18, 2014. However, because mobile GPUs under the GeForce 800M series had already been released using the Kepler architecture, Nvidia decided to rename its GeForce 800 series desktop GPUs as the GeForce 900 series.

The Maxwell microarchitecture, the successor to Kepler microarchitecture, was the first Nvidia architecture to feature an integrated ARM CPU of its own. This enabled Maxwell GPUs to be more independent from the main CPU according to Nvidia's CEO Jen-Hsun Huang. Nvidia expects three major things from the Maxwell architecture: improved graphics capabilities, simplified programming, and better energy-efficiency compared to the GeForce 700 series and GeForce 600 series.

== Architecture ==
=== First generation Maxwell (GM10x) ===
First generation Maxwell GM107/GM108 provides few consumer-facing additional features; Nvidia instead focused on power efficiency. Nvidia's video encoder, NVENC, is 1.5 to 2 times faster than on Kepler-based GPUs meaning it can encode video at 6 to 8 times playback speed. Nvidia also claims an 8 to 10 times performance increase in PureVideo Feature Set E video decoding due to the video decoder cache paired with increases in memory efficiency. However, HEVC is not supported for full hardware decoding, relying on a mix of hardware and software decoding. When decoding video, a new low power state "GC5" is used on Maxwell GPUs to conserve power.

Nvidia increased the amount of L2 cache on GM107 to 2 MB, up from 256 KB on GK107, reducing the memory bandwidth needed. Accordingly, Nvidia cut the memory bus to 128 bit on GM107 from 192 bit on GK106, further saving power. Nvidia also changed the streaming multiprocessor design from that of Kepler (SMX), naming it SMM. The layout of SMM units is partitioned so that each of the four warp schedulers controls isolated FP32 CUDA cores, load/store units and special function units, unlike Kepler, where the warp schedulers share the resources. Texture units and FP64 CUDA cores are still shared. SMM allows for a finer-grain allocation of resources than SMX, saving power when the workload isn't optimal for shared resources. Nvidia claims a 128 CUDA core SMM has 90% of the performance of a 192 CUDA core SMX.

GM107/GM108 supports CUDA Compute Capability 5.0 compared to 3.5 on GK110/GK208 GPUs and 3.0 on GK10x GPUs. Dynamic Parallelism and HyperQ, two features in GK110/GK208 GPUs, are also supported across the entire Maxwell product line.

Maxwell provides native shared memory atomic operations for 32-bit integers and native shared memory 32-bit and 64-bit compare-and-swap (CAS), which can be used to implement other atomic functions.

Maxwell supports DirectX 12.

== Products ==
=== Products formerly placed into the GeForce 800 (8xx) series ===
Nvidia has announced that the company skipped the GeForce 800 series for desktop graphics cards, most likely because the GTX 800M series consists of high-end Kepler and low-end Maxwell based components. Instead, Nvidia had announced that the newly renamed GeForce GTX 980 and GTX 970 will be introduced formally on September 19, 2014.

=== GeForce 800M (8xxM) series ===
The GeForce 800M series is designed for notebooks. The processing power is obtained by multiplying shader clock speed, the number of cores and how many instructions the cores are capable of performing per cycle. Note that all GK104 based GPUs are using the older Kepler Architecture and the 820M uses GF117 cores based on the Fermi Architecture.

- ^{1} Unified Shaders : Texture mapping units : Render output units

| Model | Launch | Code name(s) | Fab (nm) | Bus interface | Core config^{1} | Clock speed | | | Fillrate | | Memory | | | | API support (version) | | Processing Power^{2} (GFLOPS) | TDP (watts) |
| Model | Launch | Code name(s) | Fab (nm) | Bus interface | Core config^{1} | Core (MHz) | Shader (MHz) | Memory (MT/s) | Pixel (GP/s) | Texture (GT/s) | Size (MB) | Bandwidth (GB/s) | Type | Bus width (bit) | DirectX | OpenGL | Processing Power^{2} (GFLOPS) | TDP (watts) |
|---|---|---|---|---|---|---|---|---|---|---|---|---|---|---|---|---|---|---|
| GeForce 800M (Note: Lacks hardware video encoder) | March 17, 2014 | GF117 | TSMC; 28 | PCIe 2.0 ×8 | 48:8:8 | 738 | 1476 | 2000 | 5.9 | 5.9 | 2048 | 14.4 | DDR3 | 64 | 12.0 (11_0) | 4.6 | 141.7 | 15 |
| GeForce 820M | November 27, 2013 | GF117 | TSMC; 28 | PCIe 2.0 ×16 | 96:16:4 | 719–954 | 1438–1908 | 2000 | 2.9–3.8 | 11.5–15.3 | 2048 | 16 | DDR3 | 64 | 12.0 (11_0) | 4.6 | 276.1–366.3 | 15 |
| GeForce 830M (Note: Lacks hardware video encoder and decoder) | March 12, 2014 | GM108 | TSMC; 28 | PCIe 3.0 ×16 | 256:16:8 (2 SMM) | 1082 | —N/a | 2000 | 8.2 | 16.5 | 2048 | 14.4 | DDR3 | 64 | 12.0 (11_0) | 4.6 | 554 | 30 |
| GeForce 840M | March 12, 2014 | GM108 | TSMC; 28 | PCIe 3.0 ×16 | 384:24:8 (3 SMM) | 1029 | —N/a | 2000 | 8.2 | 24.7 | 2048 | 16 | DDR3 | 64 | 12.0 (11_0) | 4.6 | 790.3 | 30 |
| GeForce GTX 850M | March 12, 2014 | GM107 | TSMC; 28 | PCIe 3.0 ×16 | 640:40:16 (5 SMM) | 936+Boost; 876+Boost | —N/a | 5000 | 14.0 | 35.0 | 2048; 4096 | 32; 80 | DDR3; GDDR5 | 128 | 12.0 (11_0) | 4.6 | 1198.1 | 40 |
| GeForce GTX 860M | March 12, 2014 | GM107; GK104 | TSMC; 28 | PCIe 3.0 ×16 | 640:40:16 (5 SMM); 1152:96:16 (6 SMX) | 1029+Boost; 797+Boost | —N/a | 5000 | 16.5; 12.8 | 41.2; 76.5 | 2048; 4096 | 80 | GDDR5 | 128 | 12.0 (11_0) | 4.6 | 1317.1; 1836.3 | 40–45; 75 |
| GeForce GTX 870M | March 12, 2014 | GK104 | TSMC; 28 | PCIe 3.0 ×16 | 1344:112:24 (7 SMX) | 941+Boost | —N/a | 5000 | 22.6 | 105.4 | 3072; 6144 | 120 | GDDR5 | 192 | 12.0 (11_0) | 4.6 | 2529.4 | 100 |
| GeForce GTX 880M | March 12, 2014 | GK104 | TSMC; 28 | PCIe 3.0 ×16 | 1536:128:32 (8 SMX) | 954+Boost | —N/a | 5000 | 30.5 | 122.1 | 4096; 8192 | 160 | GDDR5 | 256 | 12.0 (11_0) | 4.6 | 2930.7 | 105 |

== Successor architecture ==
The next generation of mobile cards was the 900M series, which continued usage of the Maxwell archicture. Nvidia followed the Maxwell architecture with the Pascal architecture in 2016 in the GeForce 10 series.

== Chipset table ==
- Comparison of Nvidia graphics processing units

== Support ==
"Driver 368.81 is the last driver to support Windows XP/Windows XP 64-bit".

- Windows XP 32-bit: 368.81 driver download
- Windows XP 64-bit: 368.81 driver download

In March 2018, Nvidia discontinued support for 32-bit operating systems with the release of driver version 391.35.

Notebook GPUs based on the Kepler architecture moved to legacy support in April 2019 and stopped receiving critical security updates in April 2020. The Nvidia GeForce GTX 830M, 840M and 850M from the 8xxM GPU family were unaffected by this change.

Nvidia announced that after Release 470 drivers, it would transition driver support for the Windows 7 and Windows 8.1 operating systems to legacy status and continue to provide critical security updates for these operating systems through September 2024.

In May 2025, Nvidia discontinued developer support for the Maxwell, Pascal, and Volta architectures, which includes the Maxwell-based models of the GTX 800M Series. On July 1, 2025, Nvidia announced that driver branch 580 will be the last to support these architectures.

== See also ==
- List of Nvidia graphics processing units
- GeForce 400 series
- GeForce 500 series
- GeForce 600 series
- GeForce 700 series
- GeForce 900 series
- Nvidia Quadro
- Nvidia Tesla
- Project Denver
