= Kepler (microarchitecture) =

GPU microarchitecture by Nvidia

- Launched: April 3, 2012
- Designed by: Nvidia
- Manufactured by: TSMC
- Fabrication process: TSMC 28 nm

Product series
- Desktop: GeForce 600 series GeForce 700 series
- Professional/workstation: Quadro K
- Server/datacenter: Tesla K

Specifications
- L1 cache: 16 KB (GeForce)64 KB (Quadro)(per SM)
- L2 cache: Up to 512 KB
- Memory support: GDDR5
- PCIe support: PCIe 2.0; PCIe 3.0

Supported graphics APIs
- DirectX: DirectX 12 Ultimate (Feature Level 11_0)
- Shader model: Shader Model 6.5
- OpenGL: OpenGL 4.6
- Vulkan: Vulkan 1.2

Media engine
- Encode codecs: H.264
- Decode codecs: H.264; H.265
- Encoder supported: NVENC
- Display outputs: DVI; DisplayPort 1.2; HDMI 1.4a

History
- Predecessor: Fermi
- Successor: Maxwell

Support status
- Unsupported

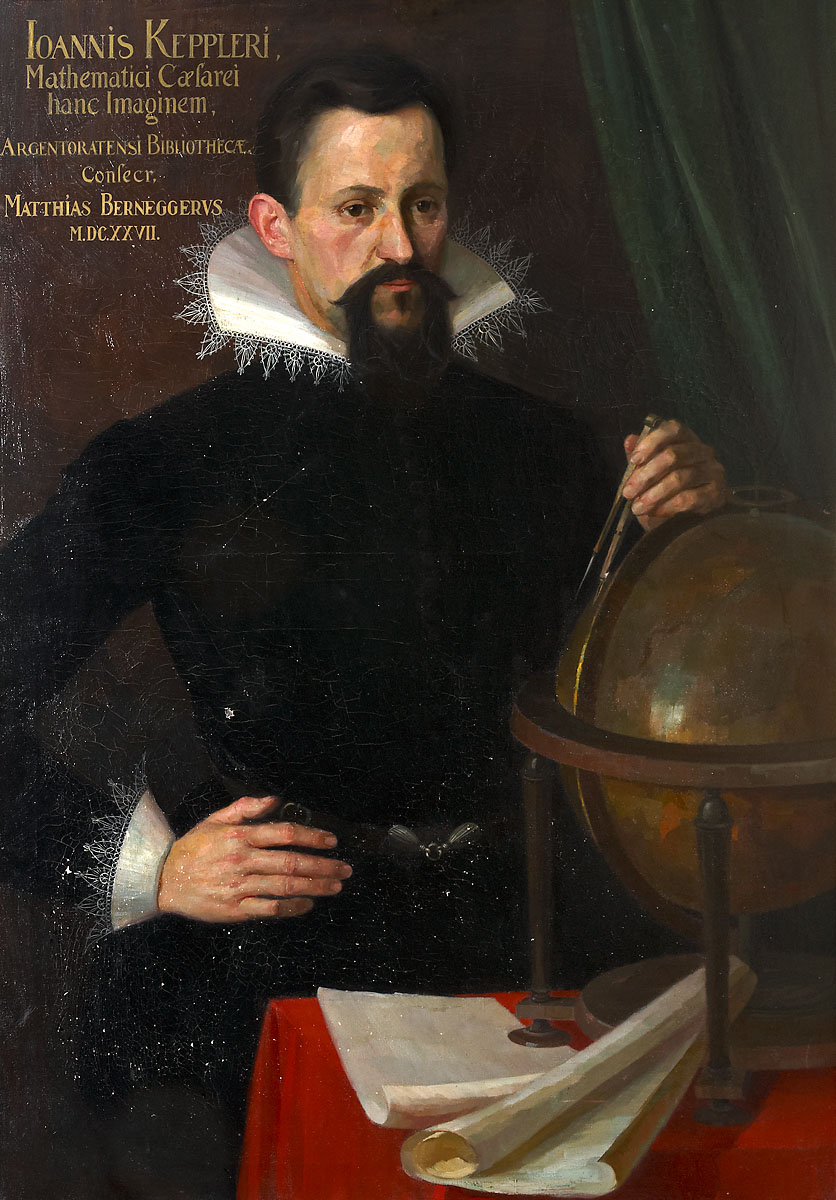
Portrait of Johannes Kepler, eponym of architecture

Kepler is the codename for a GPU microarchitecture developed by Nvidia, first introduced at retail in April 2012, as the successor to the Fermi microarchitecture. Kepler was Nvidia's first microarchitecture to focus on energy efficiency. Most GeForce 600 series, most GeForce 700 series, and some GeForce 800M series GPUs were based on Kepler, all manufactured in 28 nm. Kepler found use in the GK20A, the GPU component of the Tegra K1 SoC, and in the Quadro Kxxx series, the Quadro NVS 510, and Tesla computing modules.

Kepler was followed by the Maxwell microarchitecture and used alongside Maxwell in the GeForce 700 series and GeForce 800M series.

The architecture is named after Johannes Kepler, a German mathematician and key figure in the 17th century Scientific Revolution.

== Overview ==
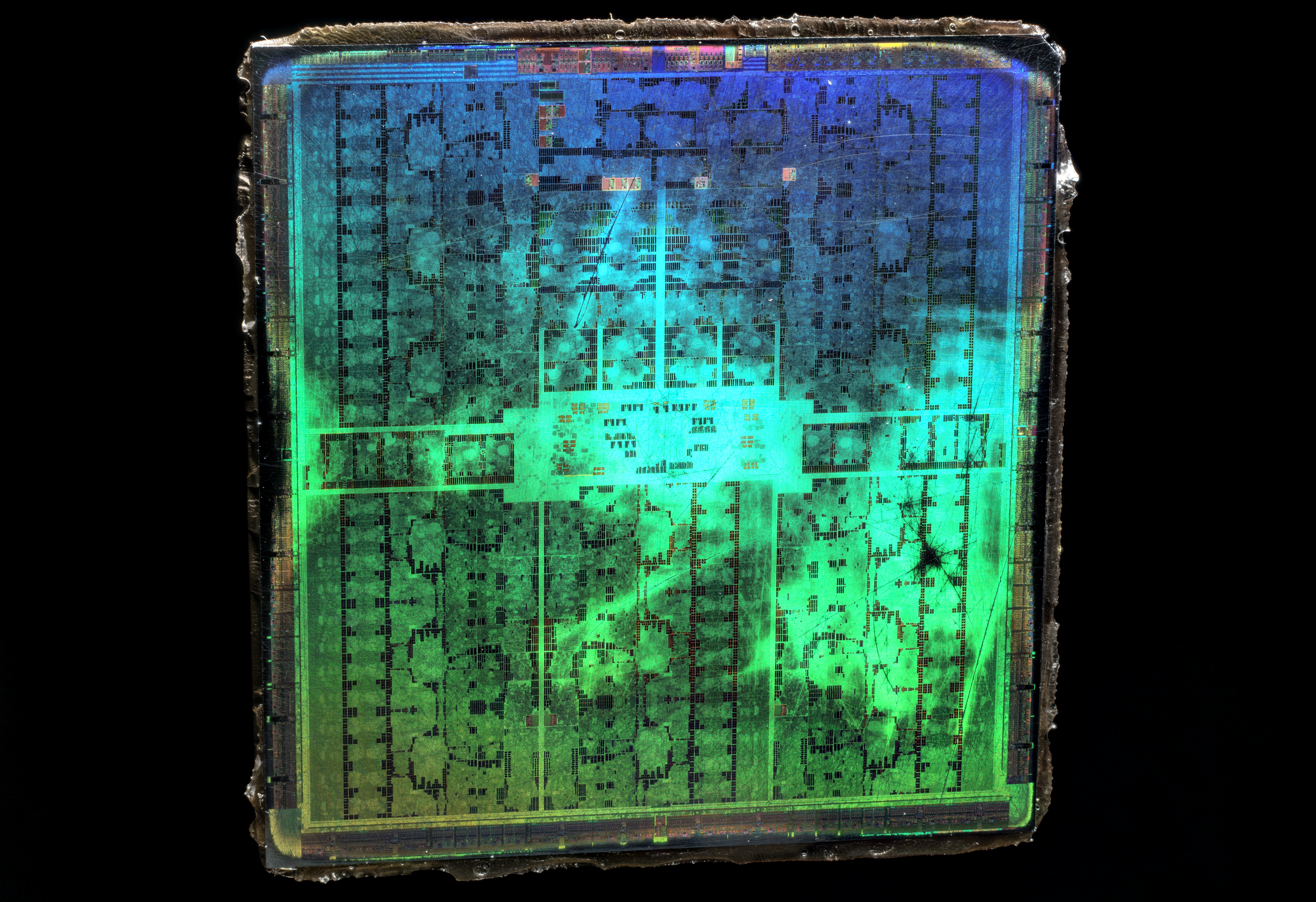
Die shot of a GK110 A1 GPU, found inside GeForce GTX Titan cards

The goal of Nvidia's previous architecture was design focused on increasing performance on compute and tessellation. With the Kepler architecture, Nvidia targeted their focus on efficiency, programmability, and performance. The efficiency aim was achieved through the use of a unified GPU clock, simplified static scheduling of instruction and higher emphasis on performance per watt. By abandoning the shader clock found in their previous GPU designs, efficiency is increased, even though it requires additional cores to achieve higher levels of performance. This is not only because the cores are more power-friendly (two Kepler cores using 90% power of one Fermi core, according to Nvidia's numbers), but also the change to a unified GPU clock scheme delivers a 50% reduction in power consumption in that area.

Programmability aim was achieved with Kepler's Hyper-Q, Dynamic Parallelism and multiple new Compute Capabilities 3.x functionality. With it, higher GPU utilization and simplified code management was achievable with GK GPUs thus enabling more flexibility in programming for Kepler GPUs.

Finally with the performance aim, additional execution resources (more CUDA cores, registers and cache) and with Kepler's ability to achieve a memory clock speed of 7 GHz, increases Kepler's performance when compared to previous Nvidia GPUs.

== Features ==
The GK Series GPU contains features from both the older Fermi and newer Kepler generations. Kepler based members add the following standard features:

- PCI Express 3.0 interface
- DisplayPort 1.2
- HDMI 1.4a 4K x 2K video output
- PureVideo VP5 hardware video acceleration (up to 4K x 2K H.264 decode)
- Hardware H.265 decoding
- Hardware H.264 encoding acceleration block (NVENC)
- Support for up to 4 independent 2D displays, or 3 stereoscopic/3D displays (NV Surround)
- Next Generation Streaming Multiprocessor (SMX)
- Polymorph-Engine 2.0
- Simplified Instruction Scheduler
- Bindless Textures
- CUDA Compute Capability 3.0 to 3.5
- GPU Boost (Upgraded to 2.0 on GK110)
- TXAA Support
- Manufactured by TSMC on a 28 nm process
- New Shuffle Instructions
- Dynamic Parallelism
- Hyper-Q (Hyper-Q's MPI functionality reserve for Tesla only)
- Grid Management Unit
- Nvidia GPUDirect (GPU Direct's RDMA functionality reserve for Tesla only)
- Vulkan API support

=== Next Generation Streaming Multiprocessor (SMX) ===
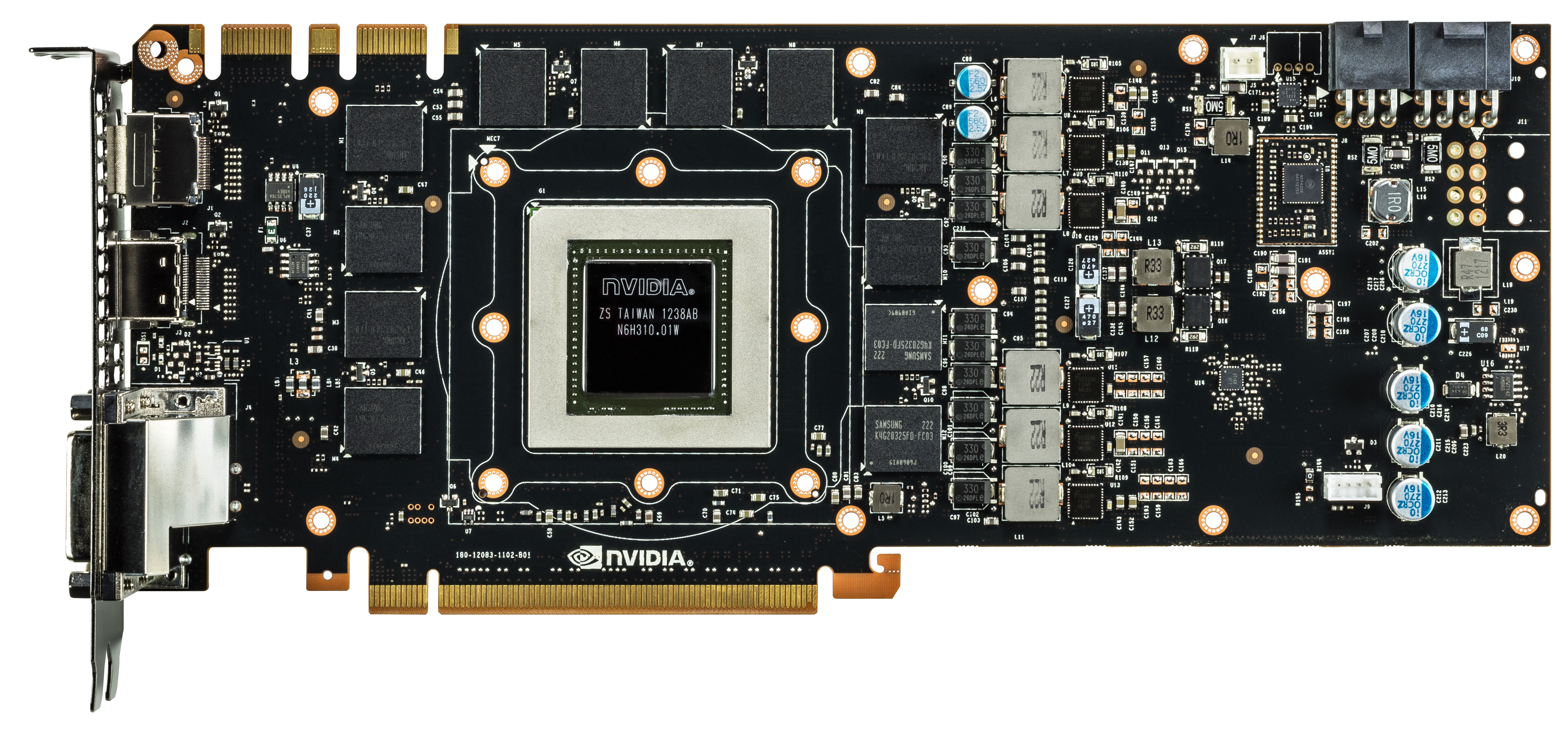
GTX 780 PCB and die - a later revision of Kepler with more similarities to the GK110 than the initial 680

Kepler employs a new streaming multiprocessor architecture called SMX. CUDA execution core counts were increased from 32 per each of 16 SMs to 192 per each of 8 SMX; the register file was only doubled per SMX to 65,536 x 32-bit for an overall lower ratio; between this and other compromises, despite the 3x overall increase in CUDA cores and clock increase (on the 680 vs. the Fermi 580), the actual performance gains in most operations were well under 3x. Dedicated FP64 CUDA cores are used rather than treating two FP32 cores as a single unit as was done previously, and very few were included on the consumer models resulting in 1/24th speed FP64 calculation compared to FP32.

On the HPC models, the GK110/210, the SMX count was raised to 13-15 depending on the product, and more FP64 cores were included to bring the compute ratio up to 1/3rd FP32. On the GK110, per-thread register limit was quadrupled over fermi to 255, but this still only allows a thread using half of the registers to parallelize to 1/4 of each SMX. The GK210 (released at the same time) increased the register limit to 512 to improve performance in high register pressure situations like this. Texture cache, which programmers had already been using for compute as a read-only buffer in previous generations, was increased in size and the data path optimized for faster throughput when using this method. All levels of memory including the register file are single-bit ECC as well.

Another notable feature is that while Fermi GPUs could only be accessed by one CPU thread at a time, the HPC Kepler GPUs added multithreading support so high core count processors could open 32 connections and more easily saturate the compute capability.

=== Simplified Instruction Scheduler ===
Additional die space reduction and power saving was achieved by removing a complex hardware block that handled the prevention of data hazards.

=== GPU Boost ===
GPU Boost is a new feature which is roughly analogous to turbo boosting of a CPU. The GPU is always guaranteed to run at a minimum clock speed, referred to as the "base clock". This clock speed is set to the level which will ensure that the GPU stays within TDP specifications, even at maximum loads. When loads are lower, however, there is room for the clock speed to be increased without exceeding the TDP. In these scenarios, GPU Boost will gradually increase the clock speed in steps, until the GPU reaches a predefined power target of 170W by default (on the 680 card). By taking this approach, the GPU will ramp its clock up or down dynamically, so that it is providing the maximum amount of speed possible while remaining within TDP specifications.

The power target, as well as the size of the clock increase steps that the GPU will take, are both adjustable via third-party utilities and provide a means of overclocking Kepler-based cards.

=== Microsoft Direct3D Support ===
Nvidia Fermi and Kepler GPUs in the GeForce 600 series support the Direct3D 11.0 specification. Nvidia originally stated that the Kepler architecture has full DirectX 11.1 support, which includes the Direct3D 11.1 path. The following "Modern UI" Direct3D 11.1 features, however, are not supported:

- Target-Independent Rasterization (2D rendering only).
- 16xMSAA Rasterization (2D rendering only).
- Orthogonal Line Rendering Mode.
- UAV (Unordered Access View) in non-pixel-shader stages.

According to the definition by Microsoft, Direct3D feature level 11_1 must be complete, otherwise the Direct3D 11.1 path can not be executed. The integrated Direct3D features of the Kepler architecture are the same as those of the GeForce 400 series Fermi architecture.

=== Next Microsoft Direct3D Support ===
Nvidia Kepler GPUs of the GeForce 600/700 series support Direct3D 12 feature level 11_0.

=== TXAA Support ===
Exclusive to Kepler GPUs, TXAA is a new anti-aliasing method from Nvidia that is designed for direct implementation into game engines. TXAA is based on the MSAA technique and custom resolve filters. It is designed to address a key problem in games known as shimmering or temporal aliasing. TXAA resolves that by smoothing out the scene in motion, making sure that any in-game scene is being cleared of any aliasing and shimmering.

=== Shuffle Instructions ===
The GK110 had a small number of instructions added to further improve performance. New shuffle instructions allow for threads within a warp to share data amongst themselves with an instruction that completes the normal store and load operations that previously required two accesses to local memory within one instruction, making the process around 6% faster than using local data storage. Atomic operations were also improved, with 9x increases in speed for some instructions and the addition of more atomic 64-bit operations, namely min, max, and, or, and xor.

=== Hyper-Q ===
Hyper-Q expands GK110 hardware work queues from 1 to 32. The significance of this being that having a single work queue meant that Fermi could be under occupied at times as there wasn't enough work in that queue to fill every SM. By having 32 work queues, GK110 can in many scenarios, achieve higher utilization by being able to put different task streams on what would otherwise be an idle SMX. The simple nature of Hyper-Q is further reinforced by the fact that it's easily mapped to MPI, a common message passing interface frequently used in HPC. As legacy MPI-based algorithms that were originally designed for multi-CPU systems that became bottlenecked by false dependencies now have a solution. By increasing the number of MPI jobs, it's possible to utilize Hyper-Q on these algorithms to improve the efficiency all without changing the code itself.

=== Dynamic Parallelism ===
Dynamic Parallelism ability is for kernels to be able to dispatch other kernels. With Fermi, only the CPU could dispatch a kernel, which incurs a certain amount of overhead by having to communicate back to the CPU. By giving kernels the ability to dispatch their own child kernels, GK110 can both save time by not having to go back to the CPU, and in the process free up the CPU to work on other tasks.

=== Grid Management Unit ===
Enabling Dynamic Parallelism requires a new grid management and dispatch control system. The new Grid Management Unit (GMU) manages and prioritizes grids to be executed. The GMU can pause the dispatch of new grids and queue pending and suspended grids until they are ready to execute, providing the flexibility to enable powerful runtimes, such as Dynamic Parallelism. The CUDA Work Distributor in Kepler holds grids that are ready to dispatch, and is able to dispatch 32 active grids, which is double the capacity of the Fermi CWD. The Kepler CWD communicates with the GMU via a bidirectional link that allows the GMU to pause the dispatch of new grids and to hold pending and suspended grids until needed. The GMU also has a direct connection to the Kepler SMX units to permit grids that launch additional work on the GPU via Dynamic Parallelism to send the new work back to GMU to be prioritized and dispatched. If the kernel that dispatched the additional workload pauses, the GMU will hold it inactive until the dependent work has completed.

=== Nvidia GPUDirect ===
Nvidia GPUDirect is a capability that enables GPUs within a single computer, or GPUs in different servers located across a network, to directly exchange data without needing to go to CPU/system memory. The RDMA feature in GPUDirect allows third party devices such as SSDs, NICs, and IB adapters to directly access memory on multiple GPUs within the same system, significantly decreasing the latency of MPI send and receive messages to/from GPU memory. It also reduces demands on system memory bandwidth and frees the GPU DMA engines for use by other CUDA tasks. The Kepler GK110 die also supports other GPUDirect features including Peer‐to‐Peer and GPUDirect for Video.

=== Video decompression/compression ===
==== NVENC ====
NVENC is Nvidia's power efficient fixed-function encode that is able to take codecs, decode, preprocess, and encode H.264-based content. NVENC specification input formats are limited to H.264 output. But still, NVENC, through its limited format, can support up to 4096x4096 encode.

Like Intel's QuickSync, NVENC is currently exposed through a proprietary API, though Nvidia does have plans to provide NVENC usage through CUDA.

== Performance ==
The theoretical single-precision processing power of a Kepler GPU in GFLOPS is computed as 2 (operations per FMA instruction per CUDA core per cycle) × number of CUDA cores × core clock speed (in GHz). Note that like the previous generation Fermi, Kepler is not able to benefit from increased processing power by dual-issuing MAD+MUL like Tesla was capable of.

The theoretical double-precision processing power of a Kepler GK110/210 GPU is 1/3 of its single precision performance. This double-precision processing power is however only available on professional Quadro, Tesla, and high-end Titan-branded GeForce cards, while drivers for consumer GeForce cards limit the performance to 1/24 of the single precision performance. The lower performance GK10x dies are similarly capped to 1/24 of the single precision performance.

== Kepler dies ==
Kepler

		GK104	GK106	GK107	GK110
Variant(s)		GK104-200-A2; GK104-300-A2; GK104-325-A2; GK104-400-A2; GK104-425-A2; GK104-850-A2	GK106-240-A1; GK107-400-A1	GK107-300-A2; GK107-301-A2; GK107-320-A2; GK107-400-A2; GK107-425-A2; GK107-450-A2; GK107-810-A2	GK110-300-A1; GK110-400-A1; GK110-425-B1; GK110-885-A1
Release date		Apr 3, 2012	Sep 6, 2012	Sep 6, 2012	Nov 12, 2012
Cores	CUDA Cores	1536	960	384	2880
Cores	TMUs	128	80	32	240
Cores	ROPs	32	24	16	48
Streaming Multiprocessors		8	5	2	15
GPCs		4	3	1	5
Cache	L1	128 KB	80 KB	32 KB	240 KB
Cache	L2	512 KB	512 KB	256 KB	1.5 MB
Memory interface		256-bit	192-bit	192-bit	384-bit
Die size		294 mm^{2}	221 mm^{2}	118 mm^{2}	561 mm^{2}
Transistor count		3.54 bn.	2.54 bn.	1.27 bn.	7.08 bn.
Transistor density		12.0 MTr/mm^{2}	11.5 MTr/mm^{2}	10.8 MTr/mm^{2}	12.6 MTr/mm^{2}
Package socket		BGA 1745	BGA 1425	BGA 908	BGA 2152
Products
Consumer	Desktop	GTX 660; GTX 660 Ti; GTX 670; GTX 680; GTX 690; GTX 760; GTX 760 Ti; GTX 770	GTX 650; GTX 650 Ti; GTX 660	GT 630; GTX 650; GT 720; GT 730; GT 740 GT 1030 (GK107 version)	GTX 780; GTX 780 Ti; GTX Titan; GTX Titan Black; GTX Titan Z (2x)
Consumer	Mobile	GTX 670MX; GTX 675MX; GTX 680M; GTX 680MX; GTX 775M; GTX 780M; GTX 860M; GTX 870M; GTX 880M	GTX 765M; GTX 770M	GT 640M; GTX 640M LE; GT 645M; GT 650M; GTX 660M; GT 740M; GT 745M; GT 750M; GT 755M; GTX 810M; GTX 820M	—N/a
Workstation	Desktop	Quadro K4200; Quadro K5000	Quadro K4000; Quadro K5000	Quadro K410; Quadro K420; Quadro K600; Quadro K2000; Quadro K2000D	Quadro K5200; Quadro K6000
Workstation	Mobile	Quadro K3000M; Quadro K3100M; Quadro K4000M; Quadro K4100M; Quadro K5000M; Quadro K5100M	—N/a	Quadro K100M; Quadro K200M; Quadro K500M; Quadro K1000M; Quadro K1100M; Quadro K2000M	—N/a

Kepler 2.0

- GK208
- GK210
- GK20A (Tegra K1)

== See also ==
- List of eponyms of Nvidia GPU microarchitectures
- List of Nvidia graphics processing units
- Nvidia NVDEC
