= NVENC =

Feature of GPUs by Nvidia

NVENC (short for Nvidia Encoder) is a feature in Nvidia graphics cards that performs video encoding, offloading this compute-intensive task from the CPU to a dedicated part of the GPU. It was introduced with the Kepler-based GeForce 600 series in March 2012 (GT 610, GT620 and GT630 is Fermi Architecture).

The encoder is supported in many livestreaming and recording programs, such as vMix, Wirecast, Open Broadcaster Software (OBS) and Bandicam, as well as video editing apps, such as Adobe Premiere Pro or DaVinci Resolve. It also works with Share game capture, which is included in Nvidia's GeForce Experience software.

Until March 2023 consumer-targeted GeForce graphics cards officially support no more than three simultaneously encoding video streams, regardless of the count of the cards installed, but this restriction can be circumvented on Linux and Windows systems by applying an unofficial patch to the drivers. Doing so also unlocks NVIDIA Frame Buffer Capture (NVFBC), a fast desktop capture API that uses the capabilities of the GPU and its driver to accelerate capture. Professional cards support between three and unrestricted simultaneous streams per card, depending on card model and compression quality, the restrictions were loosened in 2023 allowing up to 5 simultaneously encoding video streams. From January 2024 onwards, eight simultaneous encoding video streams became the baseline. From November 2025 onwards, twelve simultaneous encoding video streams became the baseline.

Nvidia chips also feature an onboard decoder, NVDEC (short for Nvidia Decoder), to offload video decoding from the CPU to a dedicated part of the GPU.

== Versions ==
NVENC has undergone several hardware revisions since its introduction with the first Kepler GPU (GK104). Graphics cards with NVENC of the second and third generations in its were not released.

NVENC summary
GPU Hardware			H.264 (AVC) (In H.264, NVENC always has B frame support, max 4096×4096 resolution)						H.265 (HEVC)							AV1		
NVENC Generation	GPU Code Name	NVENC per Chip	Chroma			Lossless Coding	Resolution	Color Depth	Chroma			Lossless Coding	Resolution	Color Depth	B Frames	Chroma	Resolution	Color Depth
NVENC Generation	GPU Code Name	NVENC per Chip	4:2:0	4:2:2	4:4:4	Lossless Coding	Resolution	Color Depth	4:2:0	4:2:2	4:4:4	Lossless Coding	Resolution	Color Depth	B Frames	4:2:0	Resolution	Color Depth
1st Gen	GK110	1	Yes	No	No	No	4096 x 4096	8-bit	H.265 not supported							AV1 not supported		
1st Gen	GK107	1	Yes	No	No	No	4096 x 4096	8-bit	H.265 not supported							AV1 not supported		
1st Gen	GK106	1	Yes	No	No	No	4096 x 4096	8-bit	H.265 not supported							AV1 not supported		
1st Gen	GK104	1	Yes	No	No	No	4096 x 4096	8-bit	H.265 not supported							AV1 not supported		
4th Gen	GM107	1	Yes	No	Yes	Yes	4096 x 4096	8-bit	H.265 not supported							AV1 not supported		
5th Gen	GM206	1	Yes	No	Yes	Yes	4096 x 4096	8-bit	Yes	No	Yes	Yes	4096 x 4096	8-bit	No	AV1 not supported		
5th Gen	GM206	1	Yes	No	Yes	Yes	4096 x 4096	8-bit	Yes	No	No	No	4096 x 4096	8-bit	No	AV1 not supported		
5th Gen	GM204	2	Yes	No	Yes	Yes	4096 x 4096	8-bit	Yes	No	No	No	4096 x 4096	8-bit	No	AV1 not supported		
5th Gen	GM200	2	Yes	No	Yes	Yes	4096 x 4096	8-bit	Yes	No	No	No	4096 x 4096	8-bit	No	AV1 not supported		
6th Gen	GP108	0	No NVENC encoders available															
6th Gen	GP107	1	Yes	No	Yes	Yes	4096 x 4096	8-bit	Yes	No	Yes	Yes	8192 x 8192	10-bit	No	AV1 not supported		
6th Gen	GP106	1	Yes	No	Yes	Yes	4096 x 4096	8-bit	Yes	No	Yes	Yes	8192 x 8192	10-bit	No	AV1 not supported		
6th Gen	GP104-2xx+	2	Yes	No	Yes	Yes	4096 x 4096	8-bit	Yes	No	Yes	Yes	8192 x 8192	10-bit	No	AV1 not supported		
6th Gen	GP104-1xx	1	Yes	No	Yes	Yes	4096 x 4096	8-bit	Yes	No	Yes	Yes	8192 x 8192	10-bit	No	AV1 not supported		
6th Gen	GP102	2	Yes	No	Yes	Yes	4096 x 4096	8-bit	Yes	No	Yes	Yes	8192 x 8192	10-bit	No	AV1 not supported		
6th Gen	GP100	3	Yes	No	Yes	Yes	4096 x 4096	8-bit	Yes	No	Yes	Yes	4096 x 4096	10-bit	No	AV1 not supported		
6th Gen	GV10x	3	Yes	No	Yes	Yes	4096 x 4096	8-bit	Yes	No	Yes	Yes	8192 x 8192	10-bit	No	AV1 not supported		
6th Gen	TU117	1	Yes	No	Yes	Yes	4096 x 4096	8-bit	Yes	No	Yes	Yes	8192 x 8192	10-bit	No	AV1 not supported		
6th Gen	TU116	1	Yes	No	Yes	Yes	4096 x 4096	8-bit	Yes	No	Yes	Yes	8192 x 8192	10-bit	Yes	AV1 not supported		
6th Gen	TU106	1	Yes	No	Yes	Yes	4096 x 4096	8-bit	Yes	No	Yes	Yes	8192 x 8192	10-bit	Yes	AV1 not supported		
6th Gen	TU104	1	Yes	No	Yes	Yes	4096 x 4096	8-bit	Yes	No	Yes	Yes	8192 x 8192	10-bit	Yes	AV1 not supported		
6th Gen	TU102	1	Yes	No	Yes	Yes	4096 x 4096	8-bit	Yes	No	Yes	Yes	8192 x 8192	10-bit	Yes	AV1 not supported		
7th Gen	GA107	1	Yes	No	Yes	Yes	4096 x 4096	8-bit	Yes	No	Yes	Yes	8192 x 8192	10-bit	Yes	Decode only		
7th Gen	GA106	1	Yes	No	Yes	Yes	4096 x 4096	8-bit	Yes	No	Yes	Yes	8192 x 8192	10-bit	Yes	Decode only		
7th Gen	GA104	1	Yes	No	Yes	Yes	4096 x 4096	8-bit	Yes	No	Yes	Yes	8192 x 8192	10-bit	Yes	Decode only		
7th Gen	GA102	1	Yes	No	Yes	Yes	4096 x 4096	8-bit	Yes	No	Yes	Yes	8192 x 8192	10-bit	Yes	Decode only		
7th Gen	GA100	0	No NVENC encoders available															
8th Gen	AD107	1	Yes	No	Yes	Yes	4096 x 4096	8-bit	Yes	No	Yes	Yes	8192 x 8192	10-bit	Yes	Yes	8192 x 8192	10-bit
8th Gen	AD106	1	Yes	No	Yes	Yes	4096 x 4096	8-bit	Yes	No	Yes	Yes	8192 x 8192	10-bit	Yes	Yes	8192 x 8192	10-bit
8th Gen	AD104-250	1	Yes	No	Yes	Yes	4096 x 4096	8-bit	Yes	No	Yes	Yes	8192 x 8192	10-bit	Yes	Yes	8192 x 8192	10-bit
8th Gen	AD104-400	2	Yes	No	Yes	Yes	4096 x 4096	8-bit	Yes	No	Yes	Yes	8192 x 8192	10-bit	Yes	Yes	8192 x 8192	10-bit
8th Gen	AD103	2	Yes	No	Yes	Yes	4096 x 4096	8-bit	Yes	No	Yes	Yes	8192 x 8192	10-bit	Yes	Yes	8192 x 8192	10-bit
8th Gen	AD102	2	Yes	No	Yes	Yes	4096 x 4096	8-bit	Yes	No	Yes	Yes	8192 x 8192	10-bit	Yes	Yes	8192 x 8192	10-bit
9th Gen	GB207	1	Yes	Yes	Yes	Yes	4096 x 4096	8-bit	Yes	Yes	Yes	Yes	8192 x 8192	10-bit	Yes	Yes	8192 x 8192	10-bit
9th Gen	GB206	1	Yes	Yes	Yes	Yes	4096 x 4096	8-bit	Yes	Yes	Yes	Yes	8192 x 8192	10-bit	Yes	Yes	8192 x 8192	10-bit
9th Gen	GB205	1	Yes	Yes	Yes	Yes	4096 x 4096	8-bit	Yes	Yes	Yes	Yes	8192 x 8192	10-bit	Yes	Yes	8192 x 8192	10-bit
9th Gen	GB203	2	Yes	Yes	Yes	Yes	4096 x 4096	8-bit	Yes	Yes	Yes	Yes	8192 x 8192	10-bit	Yes	Yes	8192 x 8192	10-bit
9th Gen	GB202	3	Yes	Yes	Yes	Yes	4096 x 4096	8-bit	Yes	Yes	Yes	Yes	8192 x 8192	10-bit	Yes	Yes	8192 x 8192	10-bit
NVENC Generation	GPU Code Name	NVENC per Chip	Chroma			Lossless Coding	Resolution	Color Depth	Chroma			Lossless Coding	Resolution	Color Depth	B Frames	Chroma	Resolution	Color Depth
NVENC Generation	GPU Code Name	NVENC per Chip	4:2:0	4:2:2	4:4:4	Lossless Coding	Resolution	Color Depth	4:2:0	4:2:2	4:4:4	Lossless Coding	Resolution	Color Depth	B Frames	4:2:0	Resolution	Color Depth

=== First generation, Kepler GK1xx ===
The first generation of NVENC, which is shared by all Kepler-based GPUs, supports H.264 high-profile (YUV420, I/P/B frames, CAVLC/CABAC), H.264 SVC Temporal Encode VCE, and Display Encode Mode (DEM).

Nvidia's documentation states a peak encoder throughput of 8× realtime at a resolution of 1920×1080 (where the baseline "1×" equals 30 Hz). Actual throughput varies on the selected preset, user-controlled parameters and settings, and the GPU/memory clock frequencies. The published 8× rating is achievable with the NVENC high-performance preset, which sacrifices compression efficiency and quality for encoder throughput. The high-quality preset is considerably slower but produces fewer compression artifacts

=== Second generation, Maxwell GM107 ===
Introduced with the first-generation Maxwell architecture, second generation NVENC adds support for the high-performance HP444 profile (YUV4:4:4, predictive lossless encoding), and increases encoder throughput up to 16× realtime, which corresponds to about 1080p @ 480 Hz with the high-performance preset.

Maxwell GM108 does not have NVENC hardware encoder support.

=== Third generation, Maxwell GM20x ===
Introduced with the second-generation Maxwell architecture, third generation NVENC implements the video compression algorithm High Efficiency Video Coding (a.k.a. HEVC, H.265) and also increases the H.264 encoder's throughput to cover 4K-resolution at 60 Hz (2160p60). However, it does not support B-frames for HEVC encoding (just I and P frames). The maximum NVENC HEVC coding tree unit (CU) size is 32 (the HEVC standard allows a maximum of 64), and its minimum CU size is 8.

HEVC encoding also lacks Sample Adaptive Offset (SAO). Adaptive quantization, look-ahead rate control, adaptive B-frames (H.264 only) and adaptive GOP features were added with the release of Nvidia Video Codec SDK 7. These features rely on CUDA cores for hardware acceleration.

SDK 7 supports two forms of adaptive quantization; Spatial AQ (H.264 and HEVC) and Temporal AQ (H.264 only).

As of 2025, Nvidia's consumer-grade (GeForce) cards are restricted to 12 simultaneous encoding jobs while its lower-end professional Quadro cards are restricted to eight simultaneous encoding jobs. Its higher-end Quadro cards do not have this restriction.

=== Fourth generation, Pascal GP10x ===
Fourth generation NVENC implements HEVC Main10 10-bit hardware encoding. It also doubles the encoding performance of 4K H.264 & HEVC when compared to previous generation NVENC. It supports HEVC 8K, 4:4:4 chroma subsampling, lossless encoding, and sample adaptive offset (SAO). Nvidia Video Codec SDK 8 added Pascal exclusive Weighted Prediction feature (CUDA based). Weighted prediction is not supported if the encode session is configured with B frames (H.264). There is no B-Frame support for HEVC encoding, and the maximum CU size is 32×32. The NVIDIA GT 1030 and the Mobile Quadro P500 are GP108 chips that don't support the NVENC encoder. In laptop graphics, NVIDIA MX Graphics do not include NVENC as they are based on a Maxwell-generation GM108 or a Pascal-generation GP108 chip. The GeForce MX350 is a GP107 chip whose NVENC encoder is disabled during manufacture.

=== Fifth generation, Volta GV10x/Turing TU117 ===
Volta NVENC has similar performance as Pascal's NVENC. It does not offer support for HEVC B-Frames.

In mobile graphics, as with most other GeForce MX-series graphics, the GeForce MX450 does not support NVENC as it is a TU117 chip whose hardware encoder is permanently disabled in its manufacture. The GeForce MX550, however, does support NVENC as its hardware encoder remains enabled at manufacturing level.

=== Sixth generation, Turing TU10x/TU116 ===
Sixth generation NVENC implements HEVC 8K encoding at 30 FPS, HEVC B-frames and HEVC B-frames as reference (with support for each and middle modes) and Alpha HEVC support and provides up to 25% bitrate savings for HEVC and up to 15% bitrate savings for H.264. The initial launch of the Nvidia GeForce GTX 1650 was exempt from this generation however, as it used Volta NVENC instead of Turing. Nvidia updated the NVENC encoder of the GTX 1650 cards in 2020 to also use the Turing engine. The GTX 1650 Super uses the Turing NVENC engine as it is based on the TU116 rather than the TU117 used in the original GTX 1650.

=== Seventh generation, Ampere GA10x ===
Ampere has essentially the same NVENC generation engine as Turing. The only substantive difference is that NVDEC received support for AV1 decoding (with film grain).

In entry-level mobile graphics, the GA107-chip-based GeForce MX570 comes in two versions, one of which (the GeForce MX570 A) has the hardware decoder and encoder permanently disabled during manufacturing.

=== Eighth generation, Ada Lovelace AD10x ===
Nvidia announced the next-gen NVENC with 8K 10-bit 60FPS AV1 fixed function hardware encoder in Ada Lovelace GPUs.

=== Ninth generation, Blackwell GB20X ===
Blackwell GPU microarchitecture (9th gen) introduced support for 4:2:2 chroma subsampling and the AV1 Ultra High Quality mode. It is also said to be 5% more efficient over its predecessor.

== Operating system support ==
The Nvidia NVENC SIP core needs to be supported by the device driver. The driver provides one or more interfaces, (e.g. OpenMAX IL) to NVENC. The NVENC SIP core can be accessed through the proprietary NVENC API, as well as the DXVA and VDPAU APIs. Support is bundled with Nvidia's GeForce drivers so operating system support depends on drivers supporting the OS. In case of Microsoft Windows, H.264 encoding was supported on Windows 7 and above. The significantly improved quality H.264 encoder which many industry reviews said was on par with x264 Fast preset, arrived with the Turing architecture GPUs. That one along with HEVC and AV1 encoders are supported only on Windows 10 and above. NVENC is available for Windows and Linux operating systems. The free and open-source nouveau device driver does not support Nvidia NVENC.

== Application software support ==
- Adobe Premiere Pro added NVENC support in version 14.2 in May 2020
- AJA Bridge Live
- Avidemux has supported NVENC since at least 2016, in H.264 or H.265
- Bandicut
- CyberLink PowerDirector has supported NVENC since Version 16 GM7 3424 Beta Patch (2016)
- DaVinci Resolve Studio when exporting video in AV1, H.264 and H.265
- FFmpeg has supported NVENC since 2014, and is supported in Nvidia drivers
- GStreamer through the nvcodec plugin
- HandBrake has supported NVENC since version 1.2.0 (December 2018), for H.264 and H.265
- HitFilm express/pro when previewing video on the timeline or exporting video in H.264 or H.265
- Jellyfin has support for NVENC for realtime transcoding
- Logitech Capture
- MacroSystem BogartSE supports NVENC export since v9.4 (October 2017) and UHD-Disc encoding since v11.3 (October 2019)
- MediaCoder
- Open Broadcaster Software (OBS)
- Shotcut
- StaxRip
- Turbo Play
- VidCoder
- VideoProc
- vMix has supported NVENC since at least 2016, with H.265 and AV1 support starting from version 27 (January 2024)

== GPU throughput ==
Comparison of Encode Throughput

Streams	H.264 Encode (1080p30)
GM204(Tesla M6)	18
GM107(Tesla M10)	28
GM200(Tesla M40)	18
GM204(Tesla M60)	36
GP104(Tesla P4)	24
TU104(Tesla T4)	32
P100	36
V100	36

== See also ==
- Intel Quick Sync Video, Intel's equivalent SIP core
- Video Coding Engine, AMD's equivalent SIP core until 2017
- Video Core Next, AMD's video core which combines the functionality of Video Coding Engine and Unified Video Decoder
- Nvidia PureVideo, hardware video decoding
- List of all Nvidia GPUs
- Nvidia NVDEC
