= IBM Hardware Management Console =

A Hardware Management Console (HMC) is a physical / virtual appliance used to manage IBM systems including IBM Z, IBM AS/400, IBM System p, and IBM Power Systems. HMC supports command line (ssh) as well as web (https) user interfaces and REST API. Using an HMC, the system administrator can manage many systems and partitions. It can also be used for monitoring and servicing a system.

== HMC for AS/400, System i, System p, and Power Systems ==
=== Supported versions ===
- HMC HMC V10 R2 M1040 for POWER8, POWER9 and POWER10 Servers
- HMC V9, for POWER7, POWER8 and POWER9 models (POWER6 support was dropped)
  - HMC V9R9.1.0 (Initial release - Support for both x86_64 and ppc64le based HMCs - dropped support for Classic GUI)
- HMC V8, for POWER6, POWER7 and POWER8 models (POWER5 support was dropped)
  - HMC V8R8.7.0 (latest version)
  - HMC V8R8.6.0
  - HMC V8R8.5.0
  - HMC V8R8.4.0
  - HMC V8R8.3.0 (Initial support for Enhanced+ GUI)
  - HMC V8R8.2.0
  - HMC V8R8.1.0 (Initial release)
- HMC V7, for POWER5, POWER6 and POWER7 models
  - HMC V7R7.9.0 (Initial support for SR-IOV cards, REST API)
  - HMC V7R3.3.0

=== Unsupported versions ===
- HMC V7
  - HMC V7R7.2.0 (initial support for Power 710, Power 720, Power 730, Power 740 and Power 795 models)
  - HMC V7R7.1.0 (initial support for POWER7)
  - HMC V7R3.5.0 (released Oct. 30, 2009)
  - HMC V7R3.4.0
  - HMC V7R3.2.0
  - HMC V7R3.1.0 (initial support for POWER6 models)
- HMC V6
  - HMC V6R1.3
  - HMC V6R1.2
- 5.2.1
- 5.1.0
- 4.5.0
- 4.4.0
- 4.3.1
- 4.2.1
- 4.2.0, for POWER5 models
- 4.1.x
- 3.x, for POWER4 models

== HMC for IBM Z ==
The HMC is a PC connected to the mainframe. zSeries mainframes prior to the IBM System z9 used a modified version of OS/2 with custom software to provide the interface. System z9's HMC no longer uses OS/2, but instead uses a modified version of Linux with an OS/2 lookalike interface to ease transition as well as a new interface. Unlike the previous HMC application on OS/2, the new HMC is web-based which means that even local access is done via a web browser. Remote HMC access is available, although only over an SSL encrypted HTTP connection. The web-based nature means that there is no longer a difference between local console access and remote access, which means a remote user potentially has full control if authorized, allowing more flexibility for locating systems within data centers. IBM refers to the new HMC as a "closed platform" which does not allow the user to install software or access the command line interface to increase security and stability. The HMC is also firewalled by default with a minimal number of open ports for remote access.
