= Volta (microarchitecture) =

GPU microarchitecture by Nvidia

Nvidia Volta
- Release date: December 7, 2017
- Codename: Volta
- Fabrication process: TSMC 12 nm (FinFET)

Cards
- Enthusiast: Tesla V100; Tesla V100S PCIe; Titan V; Titan V CEO Edition; Quadro GV100

History
- Predecessor: Pascal
- Variant: Turing (consumer, professional)
- Successor: Ampere (consumer, professional)

Support status
- Limited support until October 2025; Security updates until October 2028

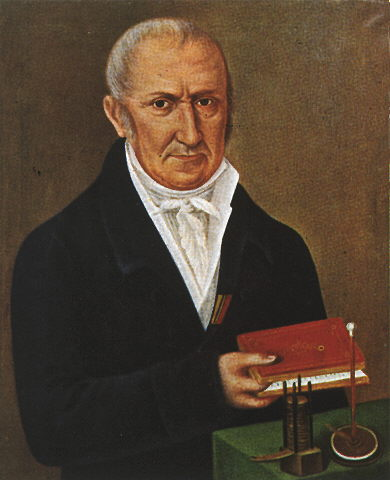
Painting of Alessandro Volta, eponym of architecture

Volta is the codename, but not the trademark, for a GPU microarchitecture developed by Nvidia, succeeding Pascal. It was first announced on a roadmap in March 2013, although the first product was not announced until May 2017. The architecture is named after 18th–19th century Italian chemist and physicist Alessandro Volta. It was Nvidia's first chip to feature Tensor Cores, specially designed cores that have superior deep learning performance over regular CUDA cores. The architecture is produced with TSMC's 12 nm FinFET process. The Ampere microarchitecture is the successor to Volta.

The first graphics card to use it was the datacenter Tesla V100, e.g. as part of the Nvidia DGX-1 system. It has also been used in the Quadro GV100 and Titan V. There were no mainstream GeForce graphics cards based on Volta.

After two USPTO proceedings, on July 3, 2023 Nvidia lost the Volta trademark application in the field of artificial intelligence. The Volta trademark owner remains Volta Robots, a company specialized in AI and vision algorithms for robots and unmanned vehicles.

== Details ==
Architectural improvements of the Volta architecture include the following:

- CUDA Compute Capability 7.0
  - concurrent execution of integer and floating point operations
- TSMC's 12 nm FinFET process, allowing 21.1 billion transistors.
- High Bandwidth Memory 2 (HBM2),
- NVLink 2.0: a high-bandwidth bus between the CPU and GPU, and between multiple GPUs. Allows much higher transfer speeds than those achievable by using PCI Express; estimated to provide 25 Gbit/s per lane. (Disabled for Titan V)
- Tensor cores: A tensor core is a unit that multiplies two 4×4 FP16 matrices, and then adds a third FP16 or FP32 matrix to the result by using fused multiply–add operations, and obtains an FP32 result that could be optionally demoted to an FP16 result. Tensor cores are intended to speed up the training of neural networks. Volta's Tensor cores are first generation while Ampere has third generation Tensor cores.
- PureVideo Feature Set I hardware video decoding

Comparison of Compute Capability: GP100 vs GV100 vs GA100

GPU features	Nvidia Tesla P100	Nvidia Tesla V100	Nvidia A100
GPU codename	GP100	GV100	GA100
GPU architecture	Nvidia Pascal	Nvidia Volta	Nvidia Ampere
Compute capability	6.0	7.0	8.0
Threads / warp	32	32	32
Max warps / SM	64	64	64
Max threads / SM	2048	2048	2048
Max thread blocks / SM	32	32	32
Max 32-bit registers / SM	65536	65536	65536
Max registers / block	65536	65536	65536
Max registers / thread	255	255	255
Max thread block size	1024	1024	1024
FP32 cores / SM	64	64	64
Ratio of SM registers to FP32 cores	1024	1024	1024
Shared Memory Size / SM	64 KB	Configurable up to 96 KB	Configurable up to 164 KB

Comparison of Precision Support Matrix

	Supported CUDA Core Precisions								Supported Tensor Core Precisions							
	FP16	FP32	FP64	INT1	INT4	INT8	TF32	BF16	FP16	FP32	FP64	INT1	INT4	INT8	TF32	BF16
Nvidia Tesla P4	No	Yes	Yes	No	No	Yes	No	No	No	No	No	No	No	No	No	No
Nvidia P100	Yes	Yes	Yes	No	No	No	No	No	No	No	No	No	No	No	No	No
Nvidia Volta	Yes	Yes	Yes	No	No	Yes	No	No	Yes	No	No	No	No	No	No	No
Nvidia Turing	Yes	Yes	Yes	No	No	No	No	No	Yes	No	No	Yes	Yes	Yes	No	No
Nvidia A100	Yes	Yes	Yes	No	No	Yes	No	Yes	Yes	No	Yes	Yes	Yes	Yes	Yes	Yes

Legend:

- FPnn: floating point with nn bits
- INTn: integer with n bits
- INT1: binary
- TF32: TensorFloat32
- BF16: bfloat16

Comparison of Decode Performance

Concurrent streams	H.264 decode (1080p30)	H.265 (HEVC) decode (1080p30)	VP9 decode (1080p30)
V100	16	22	22
A100	75	157	108

== Products ==
Volta has been announced as the GPU microarchitecture within the Xavier generation of Tegra SoC focusing on self-driving cars.

At Nvidia's annual GPU Technology Conference keynote on May 10, 2017, Nvidia officially announced the Volta microarchitecture along with the Tesla V100. The Volta GV100 GPU is built on a 12 nm process size using HBM2 memory with 900 GB/s of bandwidth.

Nvidia officially announced the Nvidia TITAN V on December 7, 2017.

Nvidia officially announced the Quadro GV100 on March 27, 2018.

Model	Launch	Code Name (s)	Fab (nm)	Transistors (billion)	Die size (mm^{2})	Bus Interface	Core config		SM Count (Note: One Streaming Multiprocessor encompasses 64 CUDA cores and 4 TMUs.)	Graphics Processing Clusters (Note: One Graphics Processing Cluster encompasses fourteen Streaming Multiprocessors.)	L2 Cache Size (MiB)	Clock speeds			Fillrate		Memory				Processing power (GFLOPS)			TDP (Watts)	NVLink Support	Launch Price (USD)
Model	Launch	Code Name (s)	Fab (nm)	Transistors (billion)	Die size (mm^{2})	Bus Interface	CUDA core (Note: CUDA cores : Texture mapping units : Render output units)	Tensor core (Note: A Tensor core is a mixed-precision FPU specifically designed for matrix arithmetic.)	SM Count	Graphics Processing Clusters	L2 Cache Size (MiB)	Base core clock (MHz)	Boost clock (MHz)	Memory (MT/s)	Pixel (GP/s)	Texture (GT/s)	Size (GiB)	Bandwidth (GB/s)	Bus Type	Bus width (bit)	Single precision (boost)	Double precision (boost)	Half precision (boost)	TDP (Watts)	NVLink Support	Launch Price (USD)
Model	Launch	Code Name (s)	Fab (nm)	Transistors (billion)	Die size (mm^{2})	Bus Interface	CUDA core	Tensor core	SM Count	Graphics Processing Clusters	L2 Cache Size (MiB)	Base core clock (MHz)	Boost clock (MHz)	Memory (MT/s)	Pixel (GP/s)	Texture (GT/s)	Size (GiB)	Bandwidth (GB/s)	Bus Type	Bus width (bit)	Single precision (boost)	Double precision (boost)	Half precision (boost)	TDP (Watts)	NVLink Support	MSRP
Nvidia Titan V	December 7, 2017	GV100-400-A1	TSMC 12 nm	21.1	815	PCIe 3.0 ×16	5120:320:96	640	80	6	4.5	1200	1455	1700	139.7	465.6	12	652.8	HBM2	3072	12288 (14899)	6144 (7450)	24576 (29798)	250	No	$2,999
Nvidia Quadro GV100	March 27, 2018	GV100	TSMC 12 nm	21.1	815	PCIe 3.0 ×16	5120:320:128	640	80	6	6	1132	1628	1696	208.4	521	32	868.4	HBM2	4096	11592 (16671)	5796 (8335)	23183 (33341)	250	Yes	$8,999
Nvidia Titan V CEO Edition	June 21, 2018	GV100	TSMC 12 nm	21.1	815	PCIe 3.0 ×16	5120:320:128	640	80	6	6	1200	1455	1700	186.2	465.6	32	870.4	HBM2	4096	12288 (14899)	6144 (7450)	24576 (29798)	250	Yes	N/A

== Application ==
Volta is also reported to be included in the Summit and Sierra supercomputers, used for GPGPU compute. The Volta GPUs will connect to the POWER9 CPUs via NVLink 2.0, which is expected to support cache coherency and therefore improve GPGPU performance.

== V100 accelerator and DGX V100 ==
Starting from P100, to V100, to A100, to H100, to B200 and to R100; the comparison of accelerators used in DGX:

=== General & Architecture ===
Model	Architecture	Socket	GPU	Fabrication Process	Transistor count (billion)	Die size (mm^{2})	Launched
P100	Pascal	SXM/SXM2	GP100	TSMC 16FF+	15.3	610	Q2 2016
V100 16GB	Volta	SXM2	GV100	TSMC 12FFN	21.1	815	Q3 2017
V100 32GB	Volta	SXM3	GV100	TSMC 12FFN	21.1	815	Q3 2017
A100 40GB	Ampere	SXM4	GA100	TSMC N7	54.2	826	Q1 2020
A100 80GB	Ampere	SXM4	GA100	TSMC N7	54.2	826	Q4 2020
H100	Hopper	SXM5	GH100	TSMC 4N	80	814	Q3 2022
H200	Hopper	SXM5	GH100	TSMC 4N	80	814	Q3 2023
B100	Blackwell	SXM6	GB100	TSMC 4NP	208	N/A	Q4 2024
B200	Blackwell	SXM6	GB100	TSMC 4NP	208	N/A	Q4 2024
R100	Rubin	SXM7	—N/a	TSMC 3N	338	—N/a	H2 2026

=== Cores, Clock & Power ===
Model	Boost clock (MHz)	#SM	Cores (FP32 CUDA)	Cores (FP64 excl. tensor)	Cores (Mixed INT32/FP32)	Cores (INT32)	TDP (W)
P100	1480	56	3584	1792	—N/a	—N/a	300
V100 16GB	1530	80	5120	2560	N/A	5120	300
V100 32GB	1530	80	5120	2560	N/A	5120	350
A100 40GB	1410	108	6912	3456	6912	N/A	400
A100 80GB	1410	108	6912	3456	6912	N/A	400
H100	1980	132	16896	4608	16896	N/A	700
H200	1980	132	16896	4608	16896	N/A	1000
B100	—N/a	—N/a	—N/a	—N/a	—N/a	—N/a	700
B200	—N/a	—N/a	—N/a	—N/a	—N/a	—N/a	1000
R100	—N/a	—N/a	—N/a	—N/a	—N/a	—N/a	2300

=== Memory & Cache ===
Model	Memory Type (HBM)	VRAM Size (GB)	Memory Speed (Gb/s)	Bus width (bits)	Bandwidth (TB/s)	L1 Cache Per SM (KB)	L1 Cache Total (KB)	L2 Cache (KB)
P100	HBM2	16	1.4	4096	0.72	24	1344	4096
V100 16GB	HBM2	16	1.75	4096	0.9	128	10240	6144
V100 32GB	HBM2	32	1.75	4096	0.9	128	10240	6144
A100 40GB	HBM2	40	2.4	5120	1.52	192	20736	40960
A100 80GB	HBM2e	80	3.2	5120	1.52	192	20736	40960
H100	HBM3	80	5.2	5120	3.35	192	25344	51200
H200	HBM3e	141	6.3	6144	4.8	192	25344	51200
B100	HBM3e	192	8	8192	8	N/A	N/A	N/A
B200	HBM3e	192	8	8192	8	N/A	N/A	N/A
R100	HBM4	—N/a	—N/a	—N/a	—N/a	—N/a	—N/a	—N/a

=== Compute Performance, Interconnect & Networking ===
Model	FP32 (TFLOPS)	FP64 (TFLOPS)	INT8 dense tensor	FP16 dense tensor	bfloat16 dense tensor	TF32 dense tensor	FP64 dense tensor	Interconnect (NVLink; TB/s)	Networking
P100	10.6	5.3	—N/a	21.2	—N/a	—N/a	—N/a	0.16	ConnectX-4 (100 Gb/s)
V100 16GB	15.7	7.8	N/A	125 TFLOPS	N/A	N/A	N/A	0.3	ConnectX-5 (100 Gb/s)
V100 32GB	15.7	7.8	N/A	125 TFLOPS	N/A	N/A	N/A	0.3	ConnectX-5 (100 Gb/s)
A100 40GB	19.5	9.7	624 TOPS	312 TFLOPS	312 TFLOPS	156 TFLOPS	19.5 TFLOPS	0.6	ConnectX-6 (200 Gb/s)
A100 80GB	19.5	9.7	624 TOPS	312 TFLOPS	312 TFLOPS	156 TFLOPS	19.5 TFLOPS	0.6	ConnectX-6 (200 Gb/s)
H100	67	34	1.98 POPS	990 TFLOPS	990 TFLOPS	495 TFLOPS	67 TFLOPS	0.9	ConnectX-7 (400 Gb/s)
H200	67	34	1.98 POPS	990 TFLOPS	990 TFLOPS	495 TFLOPS	67 TFLOPS	0.9	ConnectX-7 (400 Gb/s)
B100	—N/a	—N/a	3.5 POPS	1.98 PFLOPS	1.98 PFLOPS	989 TFLOPS	30 TFLOPS	1.8	ConnectX-7 (400 Gb/s)
B200	—N/a	—N/a	4.5 POPS	2.25 PFLOPS	2.25 PFLOPS	1.2 PFLOPS	40 TFLOPS	1.8	ConnectX-7 (400 Gb/s)
R100	—N/a	—N/a	—N/a	—N/a	—N/a	—N/a	—N/a	—N/a	ConnectX-9 (1600 Gb/s)

== See also ==
- List of eponyms of Nvidia GPU microarchitectures
- List of Nvidia graphics processing units
