= Coherent Accelerator Processor Interface =

Processor expansion bus standard

- Year created: 2014; 12 years ago
- Created by: IBM

Coherent Accelerator Processor Interface (CAPI), is a high-speed processor expansion bus standard for use in large data center computers, initially designed to be layered on top of PCI Express, for directly connecting central processing units (CPUs) to external accelerators like graphics processing units (GPUs), ASICs, FPGAs or fast storage. It offers low latency, high speed, direct memory access connectivity between devices of different instruction set architectures.

== History ==
The performance scaling traditionally associated with Moore's Law—dating back to 1965—began to taper off around 2004, as both Intel's Prescott architecture and IBM's Cell processor pushed toward a 4 GHz operating frequency. Here both projects ran into a thermal scaling wall, whereby heat extraction problems associated with further increases in operating frequency largely outweighed gains from shorter cycle times.

Over the decade that followed, few commercial CPU products exceeded 4 GHz, with the majority of performance improvements now coming from incrementally improved microarchitectures, better systems integration, and higher compute density—this largely in the form of packing a larger numbers of independent cores onto the same die, often at the expense of peak operating frequency (Intel's 24-core Xeon E7-8890 from June 2016 has a base operating frequency of just 2.2 GHz, so as to operate within the constraints of a single-socket 165 W power consumption and cooling budget).

Where large performance gains have been realized, it was often associated with increasingly specialized compute units, such as GPU units added to the processor die, or external GPU- or FPGA-based accelerators. In many applications, accelerators struggle with limitations of the interconnect's performance (bandwidth and latency) or with limitations due to the interconnect's architecture (such as lacking memory coherence). Especially in the datacenter, improving the interconnect became paramount in moving toward a heterogeneous architecture in which hardware becomes increasingly tailored to specific compute workloads.

CAPI was developed to enable computers to more easily and efficiently attach specialized accelerators. Memory intensive and computation intensive works like matrix multiplications for deep neural networks can be offloaded into CAPI-supported platforms. It was designed by IBM for use in its POWER8 based systems which came to market in 2014. At the same time, IBM and several other companies founded the OpenPOWER Foundation to build an ecosystem around Power based technologies, including CAPI. In October 2016 several OpenPOWER partners formed the OpenCAPI Consortium together with GPU and CPU designer AMD and systems designers Dell EMC and Hewlett Packard Enterprise to spread the technology beyond the scope of OpenPOWER and IBM.

On August 1, 2022, OpenCAPI specifications and assets were transferred to the Compute Express Link (CXL) Consortium.

== Implementation ==
=== CAPI ===
CAPI is implemented as a functional unit inside the CPU, called the Coherent Accelerator Processor Proxy (CAPP) with a corresponding unit on the accelerator called the Power Service Layer (PSL). The CAPP and PSL units acts like a cache directory so the attached device and the CPU can share the same coherent memory space, and the accelerator becomes an Accelerator Function Unit (AFU), a peer to other functional units integrated in the CPU.

Since the CPU and AFU share the same memory space, low latency and high speeds can be achieved since the CPU doesn't have to do memory translations and memory shuffling between the CPU's main memory and the accelerator's memory spaces. An application can make use of the accelerator without specific device drivers as everything is enabled by a general CAPI kernel extension in the host operating system. The CPU and PSL can read and write directly to each other's memories and registers, as demanded by the application.

==== CAPI ====
CAPI is layered on top of PCIe Gen 3, using 16 PCIe lanes, and is an additional functionality for the PCIe slots on CAPI enabled systems. Usually there are designated CAPI enabled PCIe slots on such machines. Since there is only one CAPP per POWER8 processor the number of possible CAPI units are determined by the number of POWER8 processors, regardless of how many PCIe slots there are. In certain POWER8 systems, IBM makes use of dual chip modules, thus doubling the CAPI capacity per processor socket.

Traditional transactions between a PCIe device and a CPU can take around 20,000 operations, whereas a CAPI attached device will only use around 500, significantly reducing latency, and effectively increasing bandwidth due to decreased operations overhead.

The total bandwidth of a CAPI port is determined by the underlying PCIe 3.0 x16 technology, peaking at ca 16 GB/s, bidirectional.

==== CAPI 2 ====
CAPI-2 is an incremental evolution of the technology introduced with IBM POWER9 processor. It runs on top of PCIe Gen 4 that effectively doubles the performance to 32 GB/s. It also introduces some new features like support for DMA and Atomics from the accelerator.

=== OpenCAPI ===
The technology behind OpenCAPI is governed by the OpenCAPI Consortium, founded in October 2016 by AMD, Google, IBM, Mellanox and Micron together with partners Nvidia, Hewlett Packard Enterprise, Dell EMC and Xilinx.

==== OpenCAPI 3 ====
OpenCAPI, formerly New CAPI or CAPI 3.0, is not layered on top of PCIe and will therefore not use PCIe slots. In IBM's CPU POWER9 it will use the Bluelink 25G I/O facility that it shares with NVLink 2.0, peaking at 50 GB/s. OpenCAPI doesn't need the PSL unit (required for CAPI 1 and 2) in the accelerator, as it's not layered on top of PCIe but uses its own transaction protocol.

==== OpenCAPI 4 ====
Planned for future chip after the General Availability of POWER9.

==== OMI ====
OpenCAPI Memory Interface (OMI) is a serial attached RAM technology based on OpenCAPI, providing low latency, high bandwidth connection for main memory. OMI uses a controller chip on the memory modules that allows for technology agnostic approach to what is used on the modules, be it DDR4, DDR5, HBM or storage class non-volatile RAM. An OMI based CPU can therefore change RAM type by changing the memory modules.

A serial connection uses less floorspace for the interface on the CPU die therefore potentially allowing more of them compared to using common DDR memory.

OMI is implemented in IBM's Power10 CPU, which has 8 OMI memory controllers on-chip, allowing for 4 TB RAM and 410 GB/s memory bandwidth per processor. These DDIMMs (Differential Dynamic Memory Module) includes an OMI controller and memory buffer, and can address individual memory chips for fault tolerance and redundancy purposes.

Microchip Technology manufactures the OMI controller on the DDIMMs. Their SMC 1000 OpenCAPI memory is described as "the next progression in the market adopting serial attached memory."

== See also ==
Legacy, abandoned

- Intel QuickPath Interconnect (QPI)
- RapidIO
- HyperTransport

Legacy, updated

- PCI Express (PCIe)
- NVLink
- Infinity Fabric (evolution of HyperTransport)

Contemporary

- Compute Express Link (CXL)
- Gen-Z
- CCIX
