= Summit (supercomputer) =

Supercomputer developed by IBM

- Sponsors: United States Department of Energy
- Operators: IBM
- Architecture: 9,216 POWER9 22-core CPUs; 27,648 Nvidia Tesla V100 GPUs
- Power: 13 MW
- Operating system: Red Hat Enterprise Linux (RHEL)
- Storage: 250 PB
- Speed: 200 petaFLOPS (peak)
- Ranking: TOP500: 7 (1H2024)
- Purpose: Scientific research
- Website: www.olcf.ornl.gov/olcf-resources/compute-systems/summit/

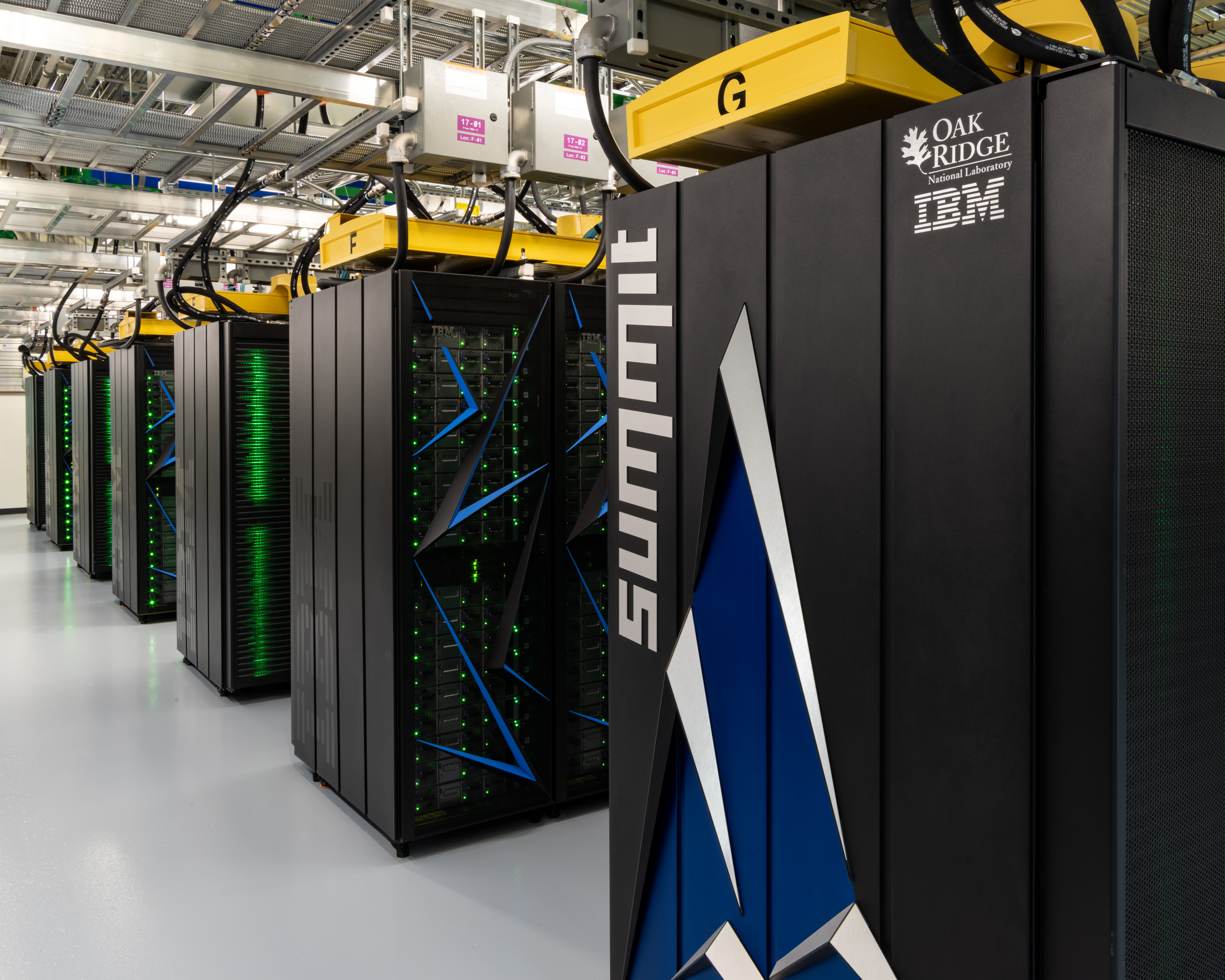
Summit components

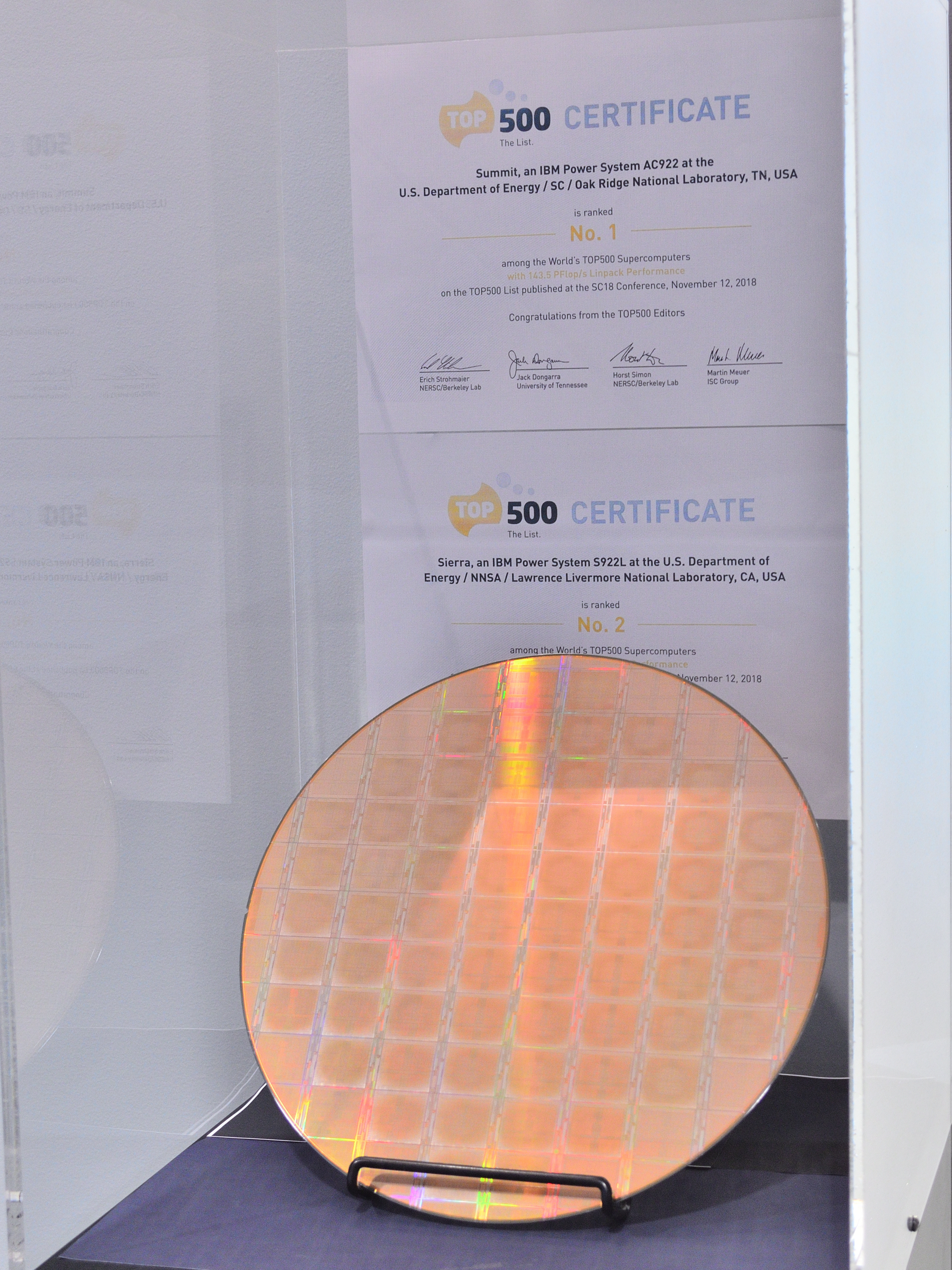
POWER9 wafer with TOP500 certificates for Summit and Sierra

Summit or OLCF-4 was a supercomputer developed by IBM for use at Oak Ridge Leadership Computing Facility (OLCF), a facility at the Oak Ridge National Laboratory, United States of America. It held the number 1 position on the TOP500 list from June 2018 to June 2020. As of June 2024, its LINPACK benchmark was clocked at 148.6 petaFLOPS. Summit was decommissioned on November 15, 2024.

As of November 2019, the supercomputer had ranked as the 5th most energy efficient in the world with a measured power efficiency of 14.668 gigaFLOPS/watt. Summit was the first supercomputer to reach exaflop (a quintillion operations per second) speed, on a non-standard metric, achieving 1.88 exaflops during a genomic analysis and is expected to reach 3.3 exaflops using mixed-precision calculations.

== History ==
The United States Department of Energy awarded a $325 million contract in November 2014 to IBM, Nvidia and Mellanox. The effort resulted in construction of Summit and Sierra. Summit is tasked with civilian scientific research and is located at the Oak Ridge National Laboratory in Tennessee. Sierra is designed for nuclear weapons simulations and is located at the Lawrence Livermore National Laboratory in California.

Summit was estimated to cover 5,600 square feet (520 m^{2}) and require 219 kilometres (136 mi) of cabling, and was designed to be used for research in diverse fields such as cosmology, medicine, and climatology.

In 2015, the project called Collaboration of Oak Ridge, Argonne and Lawrence Livermore (CORAL) included a third supercomputer named Aurora and was planned for installation at Argonne National Laboratory. By 2018, Aurora was re-engineered with completion anticipated in 2021 as an exascale computing project along with Frontier and El Capitan to be completed shortly thereafter. Aurora was completed in late 2022.

== Uses ==
The Summit supercomputer was built for research in energy, artificial intelligence, human health, and other areas. It has been used in earthquake simulation, extreme weather simulation, materials science, genomics, and predicting the lifetime of neutrinos.

== Design ==
Each of its 4,608 nodes consist of 2 IBM POWER9 CPUs, 6 Nvidia Tesla GPUs, with over 600 GB of coherent memory (96 GB HBM2 plus 512 GB DDR4) which is addressable by all CPUs and GPUs, plus 800 GB of non-volatile RAM that can be used as a burst buffer or as extended memory. The POWER9 CPUs and Nvidia Volta GPUs are connected using Nvidia's high speed NVLink. This allows for a heterogeneous computing model.

To provide a high rate of data throughput, the nodes are connected in a non-blocking fat-tree topology using a dual-rail Mellanox EDR InfiniBand interconnect for both storage and inter-process communications traffic, which delivers both 200 Gbit/s bandwidth between nodes and in-network computing acceleration for communications frameworks such as MPI and SHMEM/PGAS.

The storage for Summit has a fast in-system layer and a center-wide parallel filesystem layer. The in-system layer is optimized for fast storage with SSDs on each node, while the center-wide parallel file system provides easy to access data stored on hard drives. The two layers work together seamlessly so users do not have to differentiate their storage needs. The center-wide parallel file system is GPFS (IBM Storage Scale). It provides 250PB of storage. The cluster delivers 2.5 TB/s of single stream read peak throughput and 1 TB/s of 1M file throughput. It was one of the first supercomputers that also required extremely fast metadata performance to support AI/ML workloads exemplified by the 2.6M 32k file creates per second it delivers.

== See also ==
- Titan (supercomputer) – OLCF-3
- Frontier (supercomputer) – OLCF-5
- TOP500
- OpenBMC
- Red Hat Enterprise Linux

Records
Preceded by Sunway TaihuLight; 93.01 petaFLOPS	World's most powerful supercomputer June 2018 - June 2020; 148.6 petaFLOPS	Succeeded by RIKEN Fugaku; 0.54 exaFLOPS
