= NVLink =

High-speed chip interconnect

- Developer: Nvidia
- Manufacturer: Nvidia; ARM; Amazon Web Services; SiFive
- Type: Multi-GPU and CPU technology
- Predecessor: Scalable Link Interface (SLI)

NVLink is a wire-based serial, multi-lane, near-range, communications link developed by Nvidia. Unlike PCI Express, a device can consist of multiple NVLinks, and devices can use mesh networking to communicate instead of a central hub/switch. The protocol was first announced in March 2014 and uses a proprietary high-speed signaling interconnect (NVHS).

For small numbers of GPUs, the NVLink lanes on a single device are sufficient for an all-to-all mesh connectivity. To accommodate higher GPU counts, NVLink since 2018 use a packet-switched architecture, where a central switch can serve up to 32 two-lane ports. The NVSwitch for NVLink 4.0 can produce some simple computation of its own (e.g., sum, broadcast) to reduce the need for communication thanks to the "SHARP" accelerator.

== Principle ==
NVLink is developed by Nvidia for data and control code transfers in processor systems between CPUs and GPUs and between GPUs and GPUs. NVLink specifies a point-to-point connection with data rates of 20, 25, and 50 Gbit/s (v1.0/v2.0/v3.0+ resp.) per differential pair. For NVLink 1.0 and 2.0, eight differential pairs form a "sub-link", and two "sub-links", one for each direction, form a "link". Starting from NVlink 3.0, only four differential pairs form a "sub-link". For NVLink 2.0 and higher, the total data rate for a sub-link is 25 GB/s, and the total data rate for a link is 50 GB/s. Each V100 GPU supports up to six links. Thus, each GPU is capable of supporting up to 300 GB/s in total bi-directional bandwidth. NVLink products introduced to date focus on the high-performance application space. Announced May 14, 2020, NVLink 3.0 increases the data rate per differential pair from 25 Gbit/s to 50 Gbit/s while decreasing the number of pairs per NVLink from 8 to 4. With 12 links for an Ampere-based A100 GPU, this brings the total bandwidth to 600 GB/s. The Hopper GPU microarchitecture, announced in March 2022, has 18 NVLink 4.0 links, enabling a total bandwidth of 900 GB/s. Thus, NVLink 2.0, 3.0, and 4.0 all have a 50 GB/s per bidirectional link data rate, and have 6, 12, and 18 links, correspondingly.

NVLink 6, used in Nvidia's Vera Rubin NVL72 platform, provides 3.6 TB/s of bidirectional bandwidth per GPU. An NVL72 rack uses nine NVLink 6 switches to provide 260 TB/s of total scale-up bandwidth.

== Performance ==
The following table shows a basic metrics comparison based on standard specifications:

Interconnect	Transfer rate	Line code	Modulation	Effective payload rate per lane or NVLink (unidir.)	Max. total lane length (Note: PCIe: incl. 5" for PCBs)	Total Links (NVLink)	Total Bandwidth (PCIe x16 or NVLink)	Realized in design
PCIe 3.x	8 GT/s	128b/130b	NRZ	0.99 GB/s	50 cm (20 in)		31.51 GB/s	Pascal, Volta, Turing
PCIe 4.0	16 GT/s	128b/130b	NRZ	1.97 GB/s	20–30 cm (8–12 in)		63.02 GB/s	Volta on Xavier, Ampere, POWER9
PCIe 5.0	32 GT/s	128b/130b	NRZ	3.94 GB/s			126.03 GB/s	Hopper
PCIe 6.0	64 GT/s	236B/256B FLIT	PAM4 FEC	7.56 GB/s			242 GB/s	Blackwell
NVLink 1.0	20 GT/s		NRZ	20 GB/s		4	160 GB/s	Pascal, POWER8+
NVLink 2.0	25 GT/s		NRZ	25 GB/s		6	300 GB/s	Volta, POWER9
NVLink 3.0	50 GT/s		NRZ	25 GB/s		12	600 GB/s	Ampere
NVLink 4.0	50 GT/s		PAM4 differential-pair	25 GB/s		18	900 GB/s	Hopper, Nvidia Grace
NVLink 5.0	100 GT/s		PAM4 differential-pair	50 GB/s		18	1800 GB/s	Blackwell, Nvidia Grace

The following table shows a comparison of relevant bus parameters for real world semiconductors offering NVLink as one of their options:

Semiconductor	Board/bus delivery variant	Interconnect	Transmission technology rate (per lane)	Lanes per sub-link (out + in)	Sub-link data rate (per data direction) (Note: Data rate columns are maximum theoretical values.)	Sub-link or unit count	Total data rate (out + in)	Total lanes (out + in)	Total data rate (out + in)
Nvidia GP100	P100 SXM, P100 PCI-E	PCIe 3.0	8 GT/s	16 + 16 (Note: sample value; other fractions for the PCIe lane usage should be possible.)	128 Gbit/s = 16 GB/s	1	16 + 16 GB/s	32 (Note: a single PCIe lane transfers data over a differential pair.)	32 GB/s
Nvidia GV100	V100 SXM2, V100 PCI-E	PCIe 3.0	8 GT/s	16 + 16	128 Gbit/s = 16 GB/s	1	16 + 16 GB/s	32	32 GB/s
Nvidia TU104	GeForce RTX 2080, Quadro RTX 5000	PCIe 3.0	8 GT/s	16 + 16	128 Gbit/s = 16 GB/s	1	16 + 16 GB/s	32	32 GB/s
Nvidia TU102	GeForce RTX 2080 Ti, Quadro RTX 6000/8000	PCIe 3.0	8 GT/s	16 + 16	128 Gbit/s = 16 GB/s	1	16 + 16 GB/s	32	32 GB/s
Nvidia GA100 Nvidia GA102	Ampere A100 (SXM4 & PCIe)	PCIe 4.0	16 GT/s	16 + 16	256 Gbit/s = 32 GB/s	1	32 + 32 GB/s	32	64 GB/s
Nvidia GP100	P100 SXM, (not available with P100 PCI-E)	NVLink 1.0	20 GT/s	8 + 8 (Note: sample value; NVLink sub-link bundling should be possible.)	160 Gbit/s = 20 GB/s	4	80 + 80 GB/s	64	160 GB/s
Nvidia GV100	V100 SXM2 (not available with V100 PCI-E)	NVLink 2.0	25 GT/s	8 + 8	200 Gbit/s = 25 GB/s	6	150 + 150 GB/s	96	300 GB/s
Nvidia TU104	GeForce RTX 2080, Quadro RTX 5000	NVLink 2.0	25 GT/s	8 + 8	200 Gbit/s = 25 GB/s	1	25 + 25 GB/s	16	50 GB/s
Nvidia TU102	GeForce RTX 2080 Ti, Quadro RTX 6000/8000	NVLink 2.0	25 GT/s	8 + 8	200 Gbit/s = 25 GB/s	2	50 + 50 GB/s	32	100 GB/s
Nvidia GA100	Ampere A100 (SXM4 & PCIe)	NVLink 3.0	50 GT/s	4 + 4	200 Gbit/s = 25 GB/s	12	300 + 300 GB/s	96	600 GB/s
Nvidia GA102	GeForce RTX 3090, Quadro RTX A6000	NVLink 3.0	28.125 GT/s	4 + 4	112.5 Gbit/s = 14.0625 GB/s	4	56.25 + 56.25 GB/s	16	112.5 GB/s
NVSwitch for Hopper	(fully connected 64 port switch)	NVLink 4.0	106.25 GT/s	9 + 9	450 Gbit/s	18	3600 + 3600 GB/s	128	7200 GB/s
Nvidia Grace CPU	Nvidia GH200 Superchip	PCIe-5 (4x, 16x) @ 512 GB/s							
Nvidia Grace CPU	Nvidia GH200 Superchip	NVLink-C2C @ 900 GB/s							
Nvidia Hopper GPU	Nvidia GH200 Superchip	NVLink-C2C @ 900 GB/s							
Nvidia Hopper GPU	Nvidia GH200 Superchip	NVLink 4 (18x) @ 900 GB/s							

Real world performance could be determined by applying different data transmission overhead costs, as well as usage rates. Those come from various sources:

- 128b/130b line code (see, e.g., PCI Express data transmission for versions 3.0 and higher)
- Link control characters
- Transaction header
- Buffering capabilities
- DMA usage on computer side

Those physical limitations usually reduce the data rate to between 90-95 percent of the transfer rate. NVLink benchmarks show an achievable transfer rate of about 35.3 Gbit/s (host to device) for a 40 Gbit/s (2 sub-lanes uplink) NVLink connection towards a P100 GPU in a system that is driven by a set of IBM POWER8 CPUs.

== Use with plug-in boards ==
For the various versions of plug-in boards (a yet small number of high-end gaming and professional graphics GPU boards with this feature exist) that expose extra connectors for joining them into a NVLink group, a similar number of slightly varying, relatively compact, PCB based interconnection plugs does exist. Typically only boards of the same type will mate together due to their physical and logical design. For some setups two identical plugs need to be applied for achieving the full data rate. As of now the typical plug is U-shaped with a fine grid edge connector on each of the end strokes of the shape facing away from the viewer. The width of the plug determines how far away the plug-in cards need to be seated to the main board of the hosting computer system - a distance for the placement of the card is commonly determined by the matching plug (known available plug widths are 3 to 5 slots and also depend on board type). The interconnect is often referred as Scalable Link Interface (SLI) from 2004 for its structural design and appearance, even if the modern NVLink based design is of a quite different technical nature with different features in its basic levels compared to the former design. Reported real world devices are:

- Quadro GP100 (a pair of cards will make use of up to 2 bridges; the setup realizes either 2 or 4 NVLink connections with up to 160 GB/s - this might resemble NVLink 1.0 with 20 GT/s)
- Quadro GV100 (a pair of cards will need up to 2 bridges and realize up to 200 GB/s - this might resemble NVLink 2.0 with 25 GT/s and 4 links)
- GeForce RTX 2080 based on TU104 (with single bridge "GeForce RTX NVLink-Bridge")
- GeForce RTX 2080 Ti based on TU102 (with single bridge "GeForce RTX NVLink-Bridge")
- GeForce RTX 3090 based on GA102 (with unique "GeForce RTX NVLink-Bridge (for 30 series products)")
- Quadro RTX 5000 based on TU104 (with single bridge "NVLink" up to 50 GB/s - this might resemble NVLink 2.0 with 25 GT/s and 1 link)
- Quadro RTX 6000 based on TU102 (with single bridge "NVLink HB" up to 100 GB/s - this might resemble NVLink 2.0 with 25 GT/s and 2 links)
- Quadro RTX 8000 based on TU102 (with single bridge "NVLink HB" up to 100 GB/s - this might resemble NVLink 2.0 with 25 GT/s and 2 links)

== Service software and programming ==
For the Tesla, Quadro and Grid product lines, the NVML-API (Nvidia Management Library API) offers a set of functions for programmatically controlling some aspects of NVLink interconnects on Windows and Linux systems, such as component evaluation and versions along with status/error querying and performance monitoring. Further, with the provision of the NCCL library (Nvidia Collective Communications Library), developers in the public space shall be enabled for realizing, e.g., powerful implementations for artificial intelligence and similar computation hungry topics atop NVLink. The page "3D Settings" » "Configure SLI, Surround, PhysX" in the Nvidia Control panel and the CUDA sample application "simpleP2P" use such APIs to realize their services in respect to their NVLink features. On the Linux platform, the command line application with sub-command "nvidia-smi nvlink" provides a similar set of advanced information and control.

== History ==
On 5 April 2016, Nvidia announced that NVLink would be implemented in the Pascal-microarchitecture-based GP100 GPU, as used in, for example, Nvidia Tesla P100 products. With the introduction of the DGX-1 high performance computer base it was possible to have up to eight P100 modules in a single rack system connected to up to two host CPUs. The carrier board (...) allows for a dedicated board for routing the NVLink connections – each P100 requires 800 pins, 400 for PCIe + power, and another 400 for the NVLinks, adding up to nearly 1600 board traces for NVLinks alone (...). Each CPU has direct connection to 4 units of P100 via PCIe and each P100 has one NVLink each to the 3 other P100s in the same CPU group plus one more NVLink to one P100 in the other CPU group. Each NVLink (link interface) offers a bidirectional 20 GB/sec up 20 GB/sec down, with 4 links per GP100 GPU, for an aggregate bandwidth of 80 GB/sec up and another 80 GB/sec down. NVLink supports routing so that in the DGX-1 design for every P100 a total of 4 of the other 7 P100s are directly reachable and the remaining 3 are reachable with only one hop. According to depictions in Nvidia's blog-based publications, from 2014 NVLink allows bundling of individual links for increased point to point performance so that for example a design with two P100s and all links established between the two units would allow the full NVLink bandwidth of 80 GB/s between them.

At GTC2017, Nvidia presented its Volta generation of GPUs and indicated the integration of a revised version 2.0 of NVLink that would allow total I/O data rates of 300 GB/s for a single chip for this design, and further announced the option for pre-orders with a delivery promise for Q3/2017 of the DGX-1 and DGX-Station high performance computers that will be equipped with GPU modules of type V100 and have NVLink 2.0 realized in either a networked (two groups of four V100 modules with inter-group connectivity) or a fully interconnected fashion of one group of four V100 modules.

In 2017–2018, IBM and Nvidia delivered the Summit and Sierra supercomputers for the US Department of Energy which combine IBM's POWER9 family of CPUs and Nvidia's Volta architecture, using NVLink 2.0 for the CPU-GPU and GPU-GPU interconnects and InfiniBand EDR for the system interconnects.

In 2020, Nvidia announced that they will no longer be adding new SLI driver profiles on RTX 2000 series and older from January 1, 2021.

In 2022, the NVLink connector was removed on the Ada Lovelace architecture with Nvidia CEO Jensen Huang specifying the I/O freed up by its removal was to be used for AI processing capabilities and the intention to transition to the PCIe Gen 5.0 Standard. Some users reported that certain boards had traces of removed NVLink connectors. The NVLink technology remains available for datacenters and enterprise users.

== Support by other manufacturers ==
In 2025, NVLink Fusion was announced to allow chip designers to license and incorporate NVLink into their products. Subsequently, NVLink Fusion was licensed by ARM and SiFive for datacenter products, and Amazon Web Services for their coming Trainium4 accelerator.

== See also ==
- UALink
- Intel QuickPath Interconnect
- HyperTransport
- Message Passing Interface
- INK (operating system)
- Compute Node Linux
- Intel Xe Link
