= POWER9 =

2017 family of multi-core microprocessors by IBM

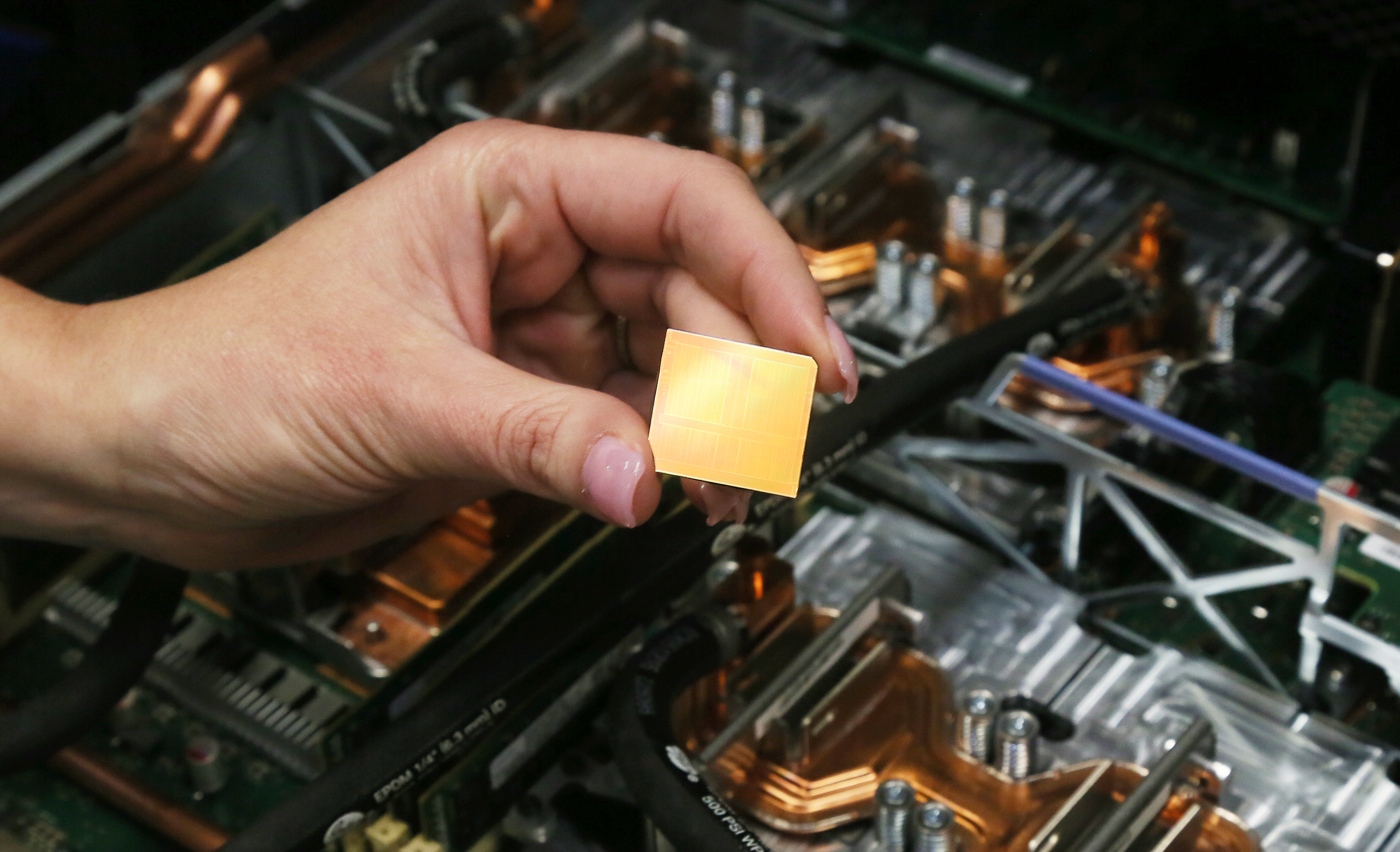
- Technician holding a POWER9 processor

General information
- Launched: 2017
- Designed by: IBM
- Common manufacturer: GlobalFoundries

Performance
- Max. CPU clock rate: 4 GHz

Physical specifications
- Cores: 12 SMT8 cores or 24 SMT4 cores on die

Cache
- L1 cache: 32+32 KiB per core
- L2 cache: 512 KiB per core
- L3 cache: 120 MiB per chip
- L4 cache: via Centaur

Architecture and classification
- Technology node: 14 nm (FinFET)
- Instruction set: Power ISA (Power ISA v.3.0)

History
- Predecessor: POWER8
- Successor: Power10

POWER9 is a family of superscalar, multithreading, multi-core microprocessors produced by IBM, based on the Power ISA. It was announced in August 2016. The POWER9-based processors are being manufactured using a 14 nm FinFET process, in 12- and 24-core versions, for scale out and scale up applications, and possibly other variations, since the POWER9 architecture is open for licensing and modification by OpenPOWER Foundation members.

Summit, the ninth fastest supercomputer in the world (based on the Top500 list) as of June 2024, is based on POWER9, while also using Nvidia Tesla GPUs as accelerators.

== Design ==
=== Core ===
The POWER9 core comes in two variants, a four-way multithreaded one called SMT4 and an eight-way one called SMT8. The SMT4- and SMT8-cores are similar, in that they consist of a number of so-called slices fed by common schedulers. A slice is a rudimentary 64-bit single-threaded processing core with load store unit (LSU), integer unit (ALU) and a vector scalar unit (VSU, doing SIMD and floating point). A super-slice is the combination of two slices. An SMT4-core consists of a 32 KiB L1 cache (1 KiB = 1024 bytes), a 32 KiB L1 data cache, an instruction fetch unit (IFU) and an instruction sequencing unit (ISU) which feeds two super-slices. An SMT8-core has two sets of L1 caches and, IFUs and ISUs to feed four super-slices. The result is that the 12-core and 24-core versions of POWER9 each consist of the same number of slices (96 each) and the same amount of L1 cache.

A POWER9 core, whether SMT4 or SMT8, has a 12-stage pipeline (five stages shorter than its predecessor, the POWER8), but aims to retain the clock frequency of around 4 GHz. It will be the first to incorporate elements of the Power ISA v.3.0 that was released in December 2015, including the VSX-3 instructions. The POWER9 design is made to be modular and used in more processor variants and used for licensing, on a different fabrication process than IBM's. On chip are co-processors for compression and cryptography, as well as a large low-latency eDRAM L3 cache.

The POWER9 comes with a new interrupt controller architecture called "eXternal Interrupt Virtualization Engine" (XIVE) which replaces a much simpler architecture that was used in POWER4 through POWER8. XIVE will also be used in Power10.

=== Scale out / scale up ===
- IBM POWER9 SO – scale-out variant, optimized for dual socket computers with up to 120 GB/s bandwidth (1 GB = 1 billion bytes) to directly attached DDR4 memory (targeted for release in 2017)
- IBM POWER9 SU – scale-up variant, optimized for four sockets or more, for large NUMA machines with up to 230 GB/s bandwidth to buffered memory (uses "25.6 GHz" signaling with the PowerAXON 25 GT/sec Link interface)

Both POWER9 variants can ship in versions with some cores disabled due to yield reasons, as such Raptor Computing Systems first sold 4-core chips, and even IBM initially sold its AC922 systems with no more than 22-core chips, even though both types of chips have 24 cores on their dies.

=== I/O ===
A lot of facilities are on-chip for helping with massive off-chip I/O performance:

- The SO variant has integrated DDR4 controllers for directly attached RAM, while the SU variant will use the off-chip Centaur architecture introduced with POWER8 to include high performance eDRAM L4 cache and memory controllers for DDR4 RAM.
- The Bluelink interconnects for close attachment of graphics co-processors from Nvidia (over NVLink v.2) and OpenCAPI accelerators.
- General purpose PCIe v.4 connections for attaching regular ASICs, FPGAs and other peripherals as well as CAPI 2.0 and CAPI 1.0 devices designed for POWER8.
- Multiprocessor (symmetric multiprocessor system) links to connect other POWER9 processors on the same motherboard, or in other closely attached enclosures.

== Chip types ==
POWER9 chips can be made with two types of cores, and in a Scale Out or Scale Up configuration. POWER9 cores are either SMT4 or SMT8, with SMT8 cores intended for PowerVM systems, while the SMT4 cores are intended for PowerNV systems, which do not use PowerVM, and predominantly run Linux. With POWER9, chips made for Scale Out can support directly attached memory, while Scale Up chips are intended for use with machines with more than two CPU sockets, and use buffered memory.

POWER9 Chips
	PowerNV	PowerVM
	24 × SMT4 core	12 × SMT8 core
Scale Out	Nimbus	unknown
Scale Up		Cumulus

=== Modules ===
The IBM Portal for OpenPOWER lists the three available modules for the Nimbus chip, although the Scale-Out SMT8 variant for PowerVM also uses the LaGrange module/socket:

- Sforza – 50 mm × 50 mm, 4 DDR4, 48 PCIe lanes, 1 XBus 4B
- Monza – 68.5 mm × 68.5 mm, 8 DDR4, 34 PCIe lanes, 1 XBus 4B, 48 OpenCAPI lanes
- LaGrange – 68.5 mm × 68.5 mm, 8 DDR4, 42 PCIe lanes, 2 XBus 4B, 16 OpenCAPI lanes

Sforza modules use a land grid array (LGA) 2601-pin socket.

== Systems ==
=== Raptor Computing Systems / Raptor Engineering ===
- Talos II – two-socket workstation/server platform using POWER9 SMT4 Sforza processors; available as 2U server, 4U server, tower, or EATX mainboard. Marketed as secure and owner-controllable with free and open-source software and firmware. Initially shipping with 4-core, 8-core, 18-core, and 22-core chip options until chips with more cores are available.
- Talos II Lite – single-socket version of the Talos II mainboard, made using the same PCB.
- Blackbird – single-socket microATX platform using SMT4 Sforza processors (up to 8-core 160 W variant), 4–8 cores, 2 RAM slots (supporting up to 256 GiB total)

=== Google–Rackspace partnership ===
- Barreleye G2 / Zaius – two-socket server platform using LaGrange processors; both the Barreleye G2 and Zaius chassis use the Zaius POWER9 motherboard

=== IBM ===
- Power System AC922 – 2U, 2× POWER9 SMT4 Monza, with up to 6× Nvidia Volta GPUs, 2× CAPI 2.0 attached accelerators and 1 TiB DDR4 RAM. AC here is an abbreviation for Accelerated Computing; this system is also known as "Witherspoon" or "Newell".
- Power System L922 – 2U, 1–2× POWER9 SMT8, 8–12 cores per processor, up to 4 TiB DDR4 RAM (1 TiB = 1024 GiB), PowerVM running Linux.
- Power System S914 – 4U, 1× POWER9 SMT8, 4–8 cores, up to 1 TiB DDR4 RAM, PowerVM running AIX/IBM i/Linux.
- Power System S922 – 2U, 1–2× POWER9 SMT8, 4–11 cores per processor, up to 4 TiB DDR4 RAM, PowerVM running AIX/IBM i/Linux.
- Power System S924 – 4U, 2× POWER9 SMT8, 8–12 cores per processor, up to 4 TiB DDR4 RAM, PowerVM running AIX/IBM i/Linux.
- Power System H922 – 2U, 1–2× POWER9 SMT8, 4–10 cores per processor, up to 4 TiB DDR4 RAM, PowerVM running SAP HANA (on Linux) with AIX/IBM i on up to 25% of the system.
- Power System H924 – 4U, 2× POWER9 SMT8, 8–12 cores per processor, up to 4 TiB DDR4 RAM, PowerVM running SAP HANA (on Linux) with AIX/IBM i on up to 25% of the system.
- Power System E950 – 4U, 2–4× POWER9 SMT8, 8–12 cores per processor, up to 16 TiB buffered DDR4 RAM
- Power System E980 – 1–4× 4U, 4–16× POWER9 SMT8, 8–12 cores per processor, up to 64 TiB buffered DDR4 RAM
- Hardware Management Console 7063-CR2 – 1U, 1× POWER9 SMT8, 6 cores, 64-128 GB DDR4 RAM.

=== Penguin Computing ===
- Magna PE2112GTX – 2U, two-socket server for high performance computing using LaGrange processors. Manufactured by Wistron.

=== IBM supercomputers ===
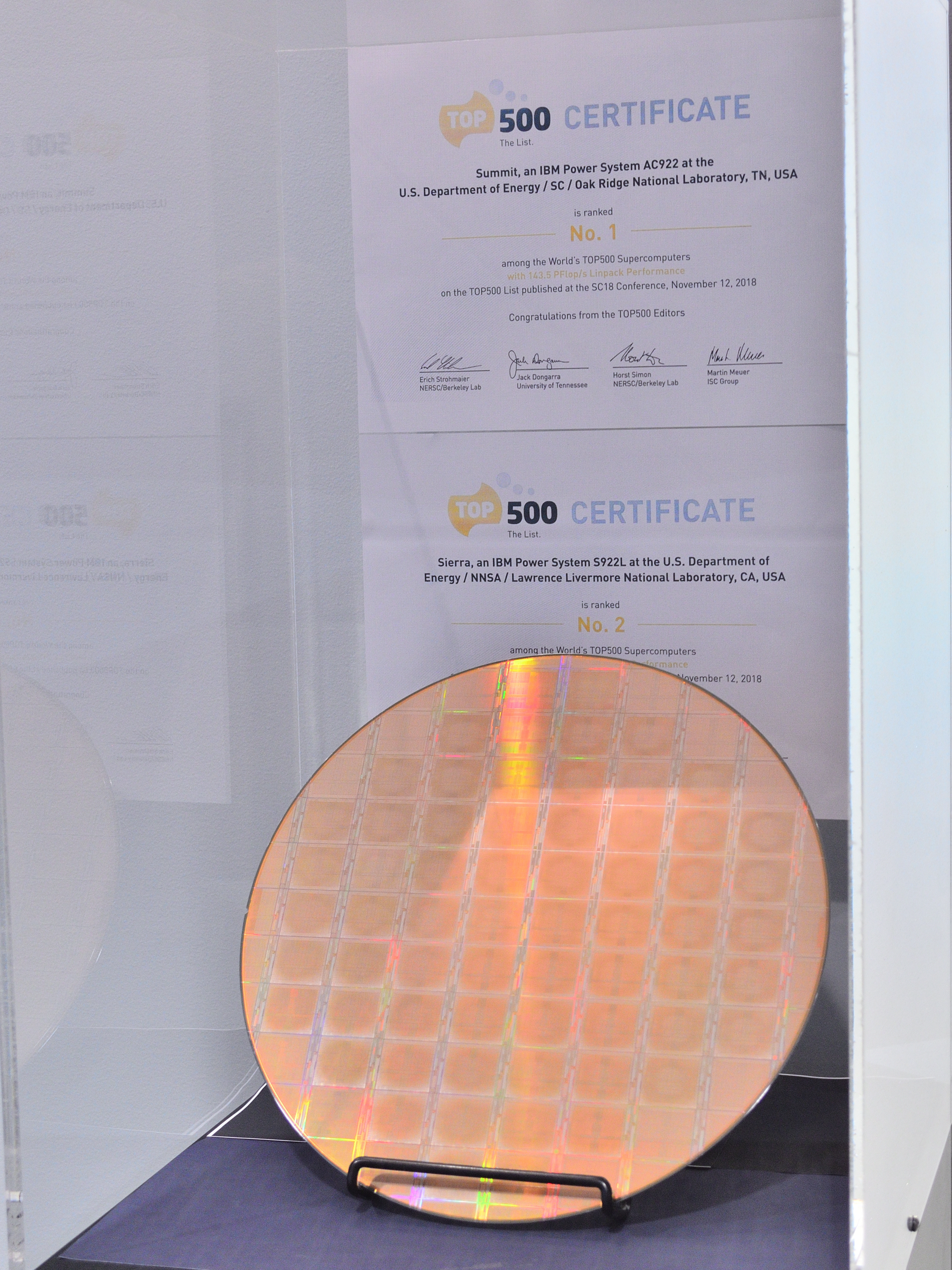
POWER9 wafer with TOP500 certificates for Summit & Sierra

- Summit and Sierra – The United States Department of Energy together with Oak Ridge National Laboratory and Lawrence Livermore National Laboratory contracted IBM and Nvidia to build two supercomputers, the Summit and the Sierra, are based on POWER9 processors coupled with Nvidia's Volta GPUs. These systems are slated to go online in 2017. Sierra is based on IBM's Power Systems AC922 compute node. The first racks of Summit were delivered to Oak Ridge National Laboratory on 31 July 2017.
- MareNostrum 4 – One of the three clusters in the emerging technologies block of the fourth MareNostrum supercomputer is a POWER9 cluster with Nvidia Volta GPUs. This cluster is expected to provide more than 1.5 petaflops of computing capacity when installed. The emerging technologies block of the MareNostrum 4 exists to test if new developments might be "suitable for future versions of MareNostrum".

== Operating system support ==
As with its predecessor, POWER9 is supported by FreeBSD, IBM AIX, IBM i, Linux (both running with and without PowerVM), and OpenBSD.

Implementation of POWER9 support in the Linux kernel began with version 4.6 in March 2016.

Red Hat Enterprise Linux (RHEL), SUSE Linux Enterprise (SLES), Debian Linux, Ubuntu Linux, and CentOS are supported as of August 2018.

The GNU Guix package manager also supports POWER9, but however support for the Guix System Distribution is in Technology Preview.

== See also ==
- IBM Power microprocessors
- OpenBMC
