= Single-chip module =

A single-chip module (SCM) is a chip package with only one die. Contrasts with multi-chip modules, where multiple dies are placed on a chip package.

== See also ==
- System in a package (SIP)
- Hybrid integrated circuit
- Chip carrier Chip packaging and package types list
- Multi-chip module (MCM)
