= Sierra (supercomputer) =

Supercomputer developed by IBM

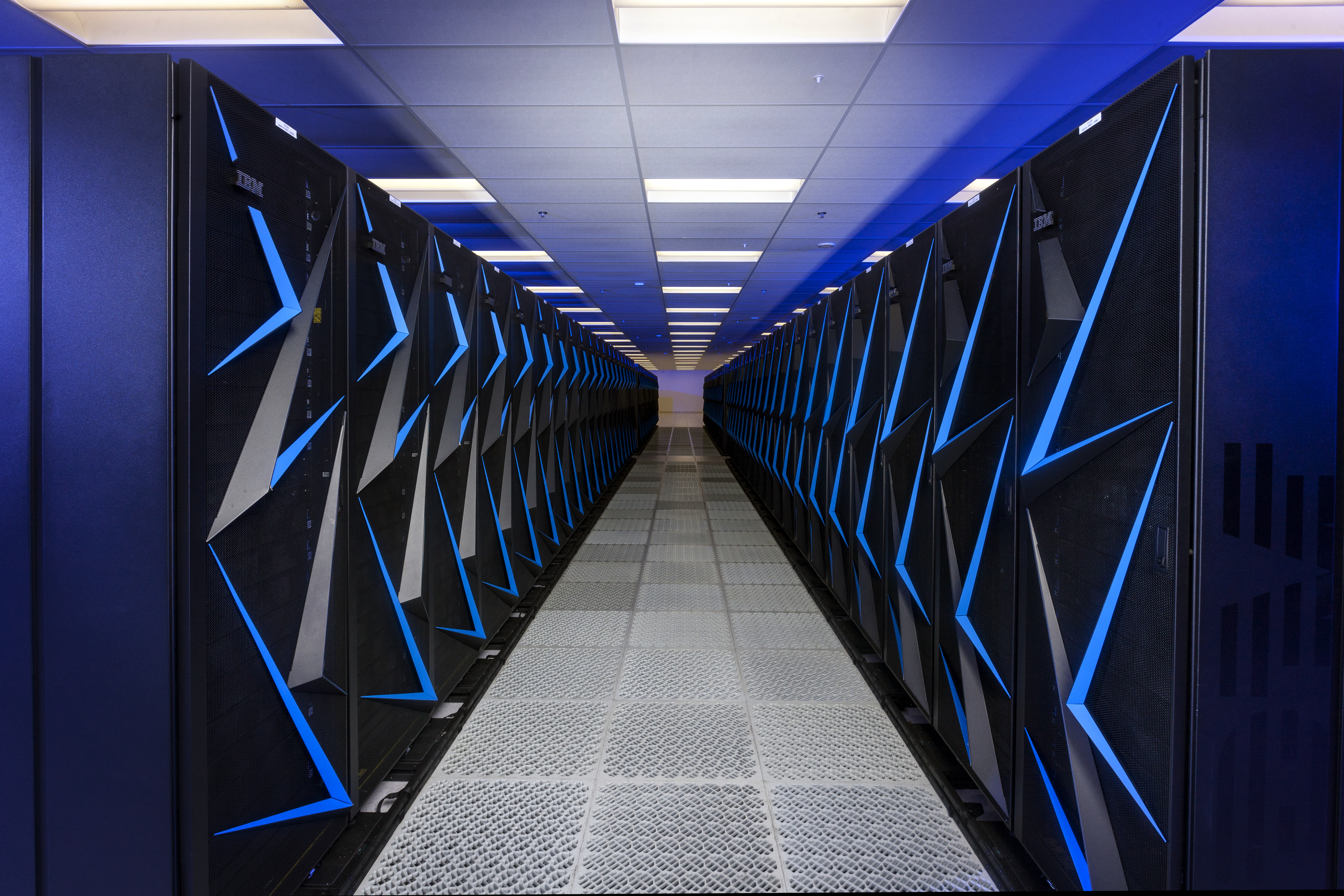
- Active: Since 2018
- Operators: National Nuclear Security Administration
- Location: Lawrence Livermore National Laboratory
- Architecture: IBM POWER9 CPUs; Nvidia Tesla V100 GPUs; Mellanox EDR InfiniBand
- Power: 11 MW
- Operating system: Red Hat Enterprise Linux
- Memory: 2–2.4 PiB
- Speed: 125 petaflops (peak)
- Ranking: TOP500: 20, June 2025
- Purpose: Nuclear weapon simulations
- Website: hpc.llnl.gov/hardware/compute-platforms/sierra

Sierra or ATS-2 is a supercomputer built for the Lawrence Livermore National Laboratory for use by the National Nuclear Security Administration as the second Advanced Technology System. It is primarily used for predictive applications in nuclear weapon stockpile stewardship, helping to assure the safety, reliability, and effectiveness of the United States' nuclear weapons.

Sierra is very similar in architecture to the Summit supercomputer built for the Oak Ridge National Laboratory. The nodes in Sierra are Witherspoon IBM S922LC OpenPOWER servers with two GPUs per CPU and four GPUs per node. These nodes are connected with EDR InfiniBand. In 2019 Sierra was upgraded with IBM Power System AC922 nodes.

Sierra is composed of 4,474 nodes, 4,284 of which are compute nodes. Each node has 256GB of RAM, 44 IBM POWER9 cores spread across two physical sockets, and Four Nvidia Tesla V100 GPUs, each providing 16GB of VRAM. This gives the complete system 8,948 CPUs, 17,896 GPUs, 1.14 PB of RAM, and 286 TB of VRAM.

Sierra has consistently appeared on the Top500 list, peaking at second place in November 2018. As of November 2023, it is in tenth place. Only 4.6 petaflops of its performance come from its CPUs, with the large majority (120.9 petaflops) coming from the Tesla GPUs.

Sierra was decommissioned in October 2025.

== See also ==
- Trinity (supercomputer) – ATS-1, the first Advanced Technology System
- OpenBMC
