= Dell Latitude =

Line of business-oriented laptop computers by Dell

- Developer: Dell
- Manufacturer: Dell
- Type: Laptop
- Released: 1994; 32 years ago
- Discontinued: January 2025
- Operating system: Windows, Linux
- CPU: Intel, AMD
- Graphics: Intel/AMD (integrated); AMD/Nvidia (discrete)
- Marketing target: Business
- Successor: Dell Pro
- Related: OptiPlex, Precision, Vostro, Inspiron, XPS
- Website: Dell Latitude

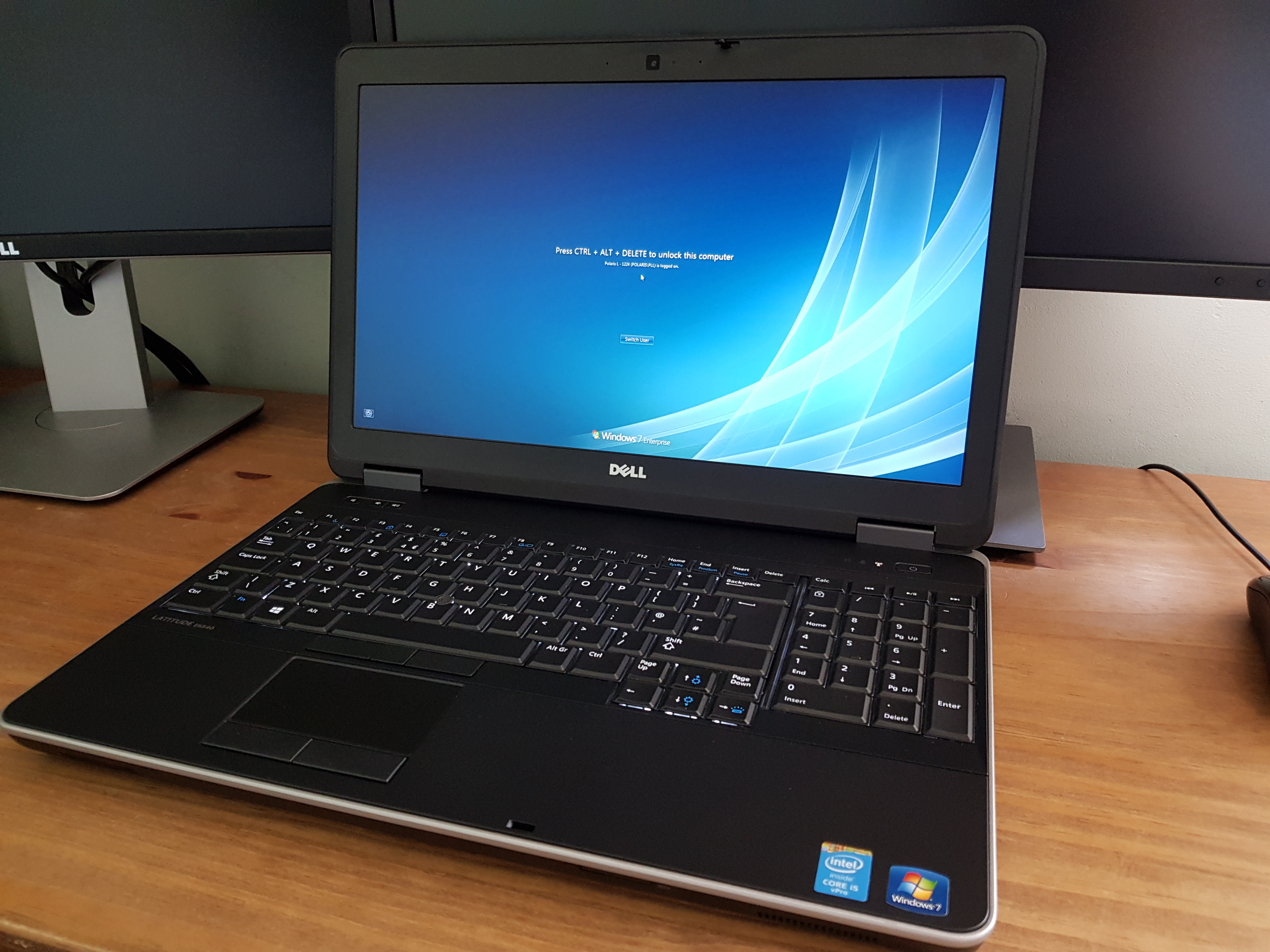
Latitude E6540

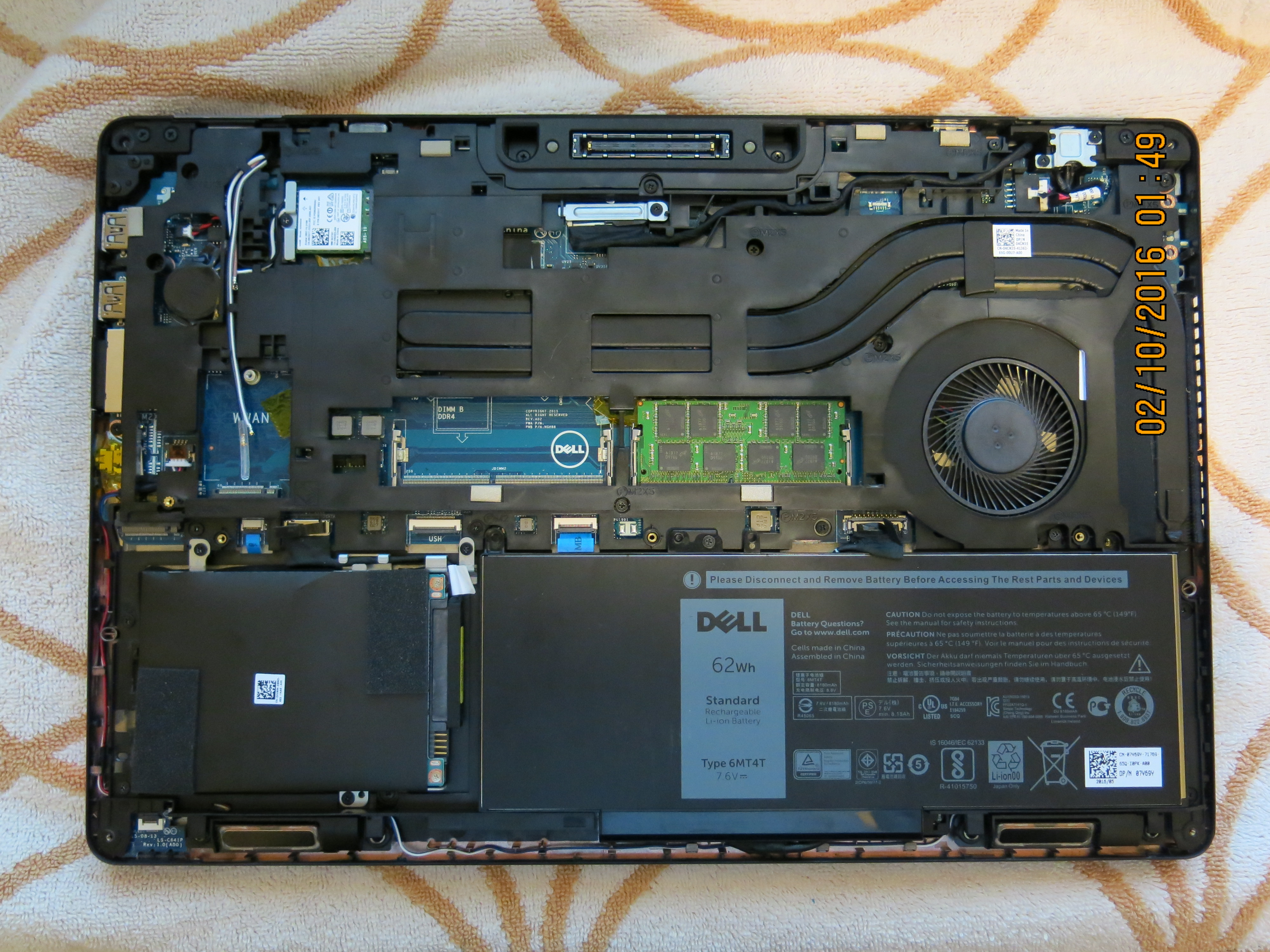
Latitude E5570 with its back cover open

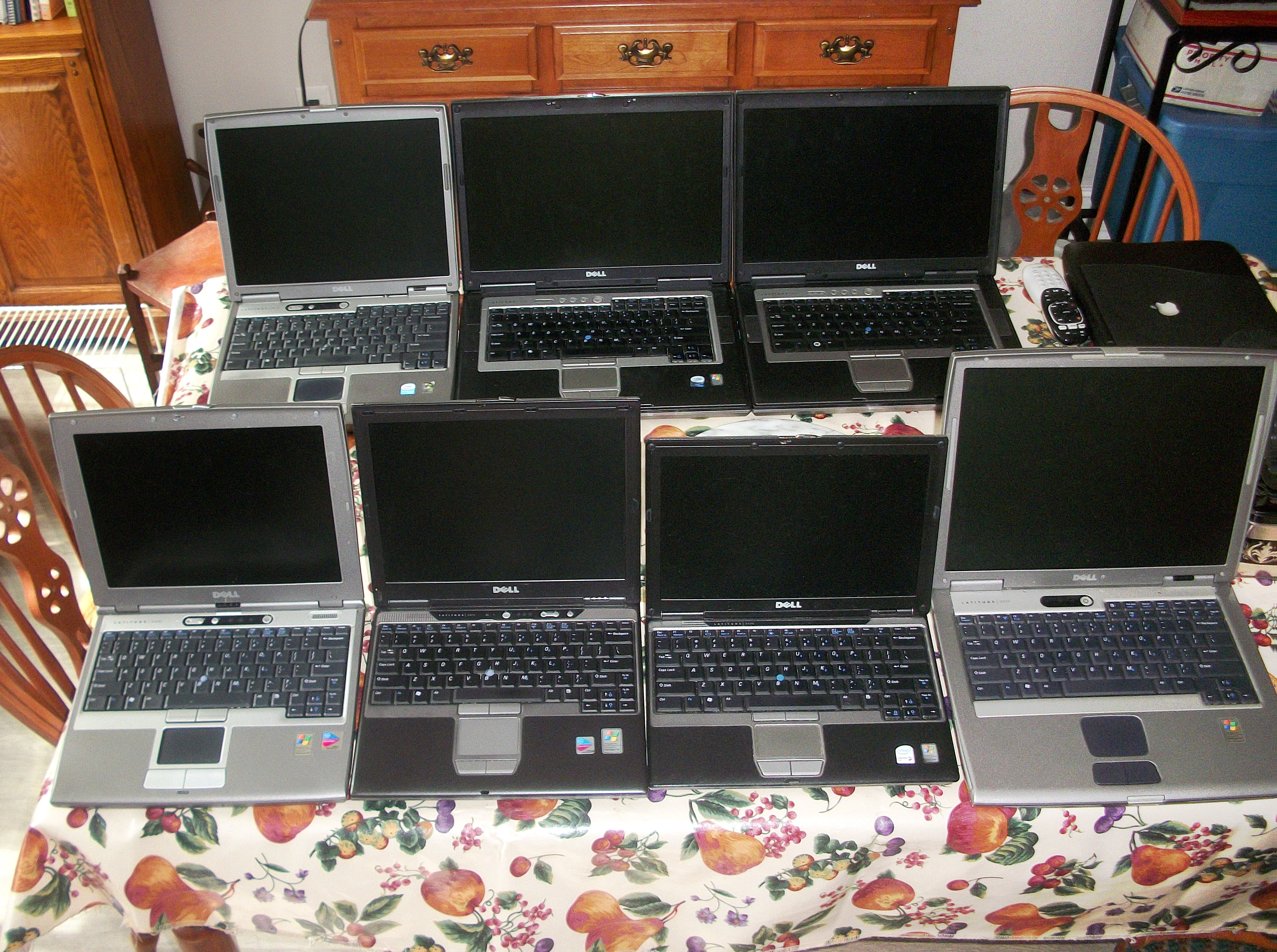
Seven members of the Latitude D-series. From left to right; Bottom Row: D400, D410, D420, D505; Top Row: D610, D820, D830.

Dell Latitude is a discontinued line of laptop computers manufactured and sold by American company Dell. It was a business-oriented line, aimed at corporate enterprises, healthcare, government, and education markets, sitting alongside Inspiron and XPS for consumers, and Vostro for smaller businesses.

The Latitude line directly competed with Acer's TravelMate, Asus's ExpertBook, HP's EliteBook, Lenovo's ThinkPad and Toshiba's Portégé. The "Rugged (Extreme)", "XFR" and "ATG" models compete primarily with Panasonic's Toughbook line of "rugged" laptops.

In January 2025 Dell announced a major restructuring that saw the demise of the Latitude brand, along with others. Latitude was succeeded by Dell Pro.

== Overview and product type ==
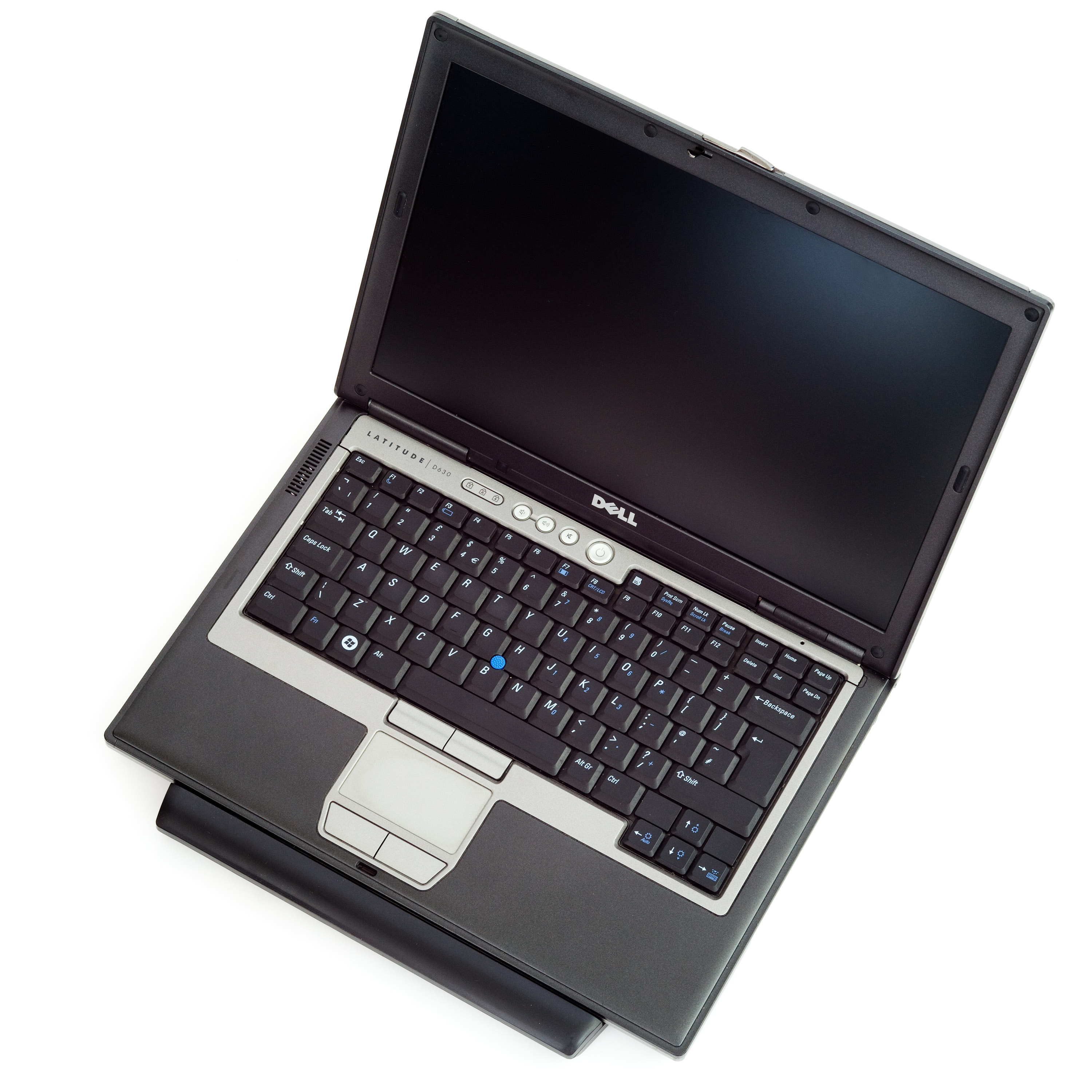
A Dell Latitude D630

Dell in 1993 discontinued its unsuccessful existing laptop computers. After hiring John Medica, who had led development of the very successful Apple PowerBooks, the company introduced the first Latitude portables in 1994.

The Dell Latitude series have dropped the initial alphabet in newer model types (as in Latitude 7480 whose predecessor was E7470), and became the successor to the popular Latitude E, D, C, and X series. The Latitudes from the early 1990s up until the C*00 lines weren't in a set "series", instead of going under the models CP and XP with modifiers at the end, e.g.: XPi, CP M233.

In the past, the high-end line was the 6 series, being the C6x0, D6x0, and E64x0 lines, but as of 2015 this line has been discontinued and replaced by both the 5 series and the 7 series. The 15" "Premium" line was the 8 series, until the E-series merged this line with the 6 series (Model numbers being along the lines of C8x0 or D8x0). The entry-level line was the 5 series, but as of 2015 the 5 series and 7 series Latitude laptops are the primary lines of Latitude laptops. The 3 series has replaced the 5 series as the budget line. Dell has also since dropped the E from the Latitude line (due to switching to a USB C/Thunderbolt dock system, rather than the e-Port analog pin-system docks), and the models are delineated by number now, e.g.: Latitude 5480, 5570. The second number in the model (as in, 5470 or 7280) indicates the size of the screen on the laptop.

The latest Dell Latitude lineup is as follows:

- Latitude 3xxx series. Budget models intended for education and small businesses, available in 13.3"/14"/15.6" trims.
- Latitude 5xxx series. Mainstream line. Replaces the 6000 series and shares same chassis with Mobile workstation models. available in 11.1"/12.5"/13.3"/14"/15.6" trims.
- Latitude 7xxx series. "Premium" Ultrabooks, available in /13.3"/14"/16" trims.
- Latitude 9xxx series. "Ultra-premium" laptops and 2-in-1s. Available with 14- and 15-inch displays and are the first laptops featuring 5G WWAN

Latitude computers are also differentiated in their feature sets, due to their business focus. For example, they often include security features such as smartcard and contactless smartcard, and TPM security, vPro and AMD DASH management, DisplayPort (as opposed to HDMI), Docking stations and support for legacy standards are all results of the requirements of the business market.

Some models also have the capability of Latitude ON which can be selected during the configuration of the laptop. Latitude ON is essentially a system within a system. It requires a separate add on module which contains its own microprocessor and operating system. This allows the laptop to function in the realm of a netbook.

== Latest models ==
Latitude (2008–2024)
List does not include rugged modifications
Size	Type	**00 (2008/2009)	**10 (2010)	**20 (2011)	**30 (2012)	**40 (2013/2014)	**50/60 (2015)	**70 (2016)	**80 (2017)	**90 (2018)	**00 (2019)	**10 (2020)	**20 (2021)	**30 (2022)	**40 (2023)	**50 (2024)
Ultra premium ultrabook (9000 series)
15.6"	Ultraportable (ultrabook)											9510 2-in-1				
15.6"	Ultraportable (ultrabook)											9510	9520			
14"	Ultraportable (ultrabook)											9410 2-in-1	9420 2-in-1	9430 2-in-1	9440 2-in-1	9450 2-in-1
14"	Ultraportable (ultrabook)											9410	9420	9430	9440	9450
13.3"	Ultraportable (ultrabook)													9330 2-in-1		
13.3"	Ultraportable (ultrabook)													9330		
Ultrabook (7000 series)
16"	Ultraportable (ultrabook)	Z600													7640	7650
15.6"	Ultraportable (ultrabook)												7520	7530		
14"	Ultraportable (ultrabook)				6430u	E7440	E7450	E7470	7480	7490	7400	7410	7420	7430	7440	7450
14"	Ultraportable (ultrabook)										7400 2-in-1	7410 2-in-1	7420 2-in-1	7430 2-in-1	7420 2-in-1	7430
13.3"	Ultraportable (ultrabook)							E7370	7380	7390	7300	7310	7320	7330	7340	7350
13.3"	Convertible						E7350	7370	7389 2-in-1	7390 2-in-1						
12.5"	Convertible							E7275	7285			7200 2-in-1	7210 2-in-1			
12.5"	Ultraportable (ultrabook)					E7240	E7250	E7270	7280	7290						
High-end (6000 series)
15.6"	Mainstream	E6500	E6510	E6520	E6530	E6540	replaced by E5000 series (E7000 series for 6430u)									
14"	Mainstream	E6400	E6410	E6420	E6430	E6440	replaced by E5000 series (E7000 series for 6430u)									
13.3"	Mainstream	E4300	E4310	E6320	E6330		replaced by E5000 series (E7000 series for 6430u)									
12.5"	Mainstream	E4200		E6220	E6230		replaced by E5000 series (E7000 series for 6430u)									
Mid-range (5000 series)
15.6"	Mainstream	E5500	E5510	E5520	E5530	E5540	E5550	E5570	5580	5590	5500	5510	5520	5530	5540	5550
15.6"	Performance									5591	5501	5511	5521	5531		
14"	Mainstream	E5400	E5410	E5420	E5430	E5440	E5450	E5470	5480	5490	5400	5410	5420	5430	5440	5450
14"	Mainstream									5495						
14"	Performance									5491	5401	5411	5421	5431		
13.3"	Mainstream										5300	5310	5320	5330	5340	5350
13.3"	2-in-1			XT3							5300 2-in-1	5310 2-in-1	5320 2-in-1	5330 2-in-1	5340 2-in-1	5350 2-in-1
12.5"	Mainstream						E5250	E5270	5280	5290	replaced by 53xx series					
12.5"	2-in-1								5285	replaced by 52xx 2-in-1						
12.5"	2-in-1								5289	5290 2-in-1	replaced by 53xx series					
10.8"	2-in-1							E5175/9								
10.1"	Tablet			10-ST2												
Entry-level (3000 series)
15.6"	Mainstream					E3540	E3550/E3560	E3570	3580	3590	3500	3510	3520	3530	3540	3550
14"	Mainstream					E3440	E3450/E3460	E3470	3480	3490	3400	3410	3420	3430	3440	3450
13.3"	Mainstream					E3340	E3350	E3379	3380	3390	3301					
13.3"	Mainstream										3300	3310	3320	3330		
13.3"	2-in-1							E3379 2-in-1		3390 2-in-1				3330 2-in-1		
11.6"	2-in-1								3189							
11.6"	Netbook						E3150/E3160		3180	3190			3120		3140	3150
10.1"	Netbook	E2100	E2110	E2120												
10.1"	Tablet				10-ST2e											

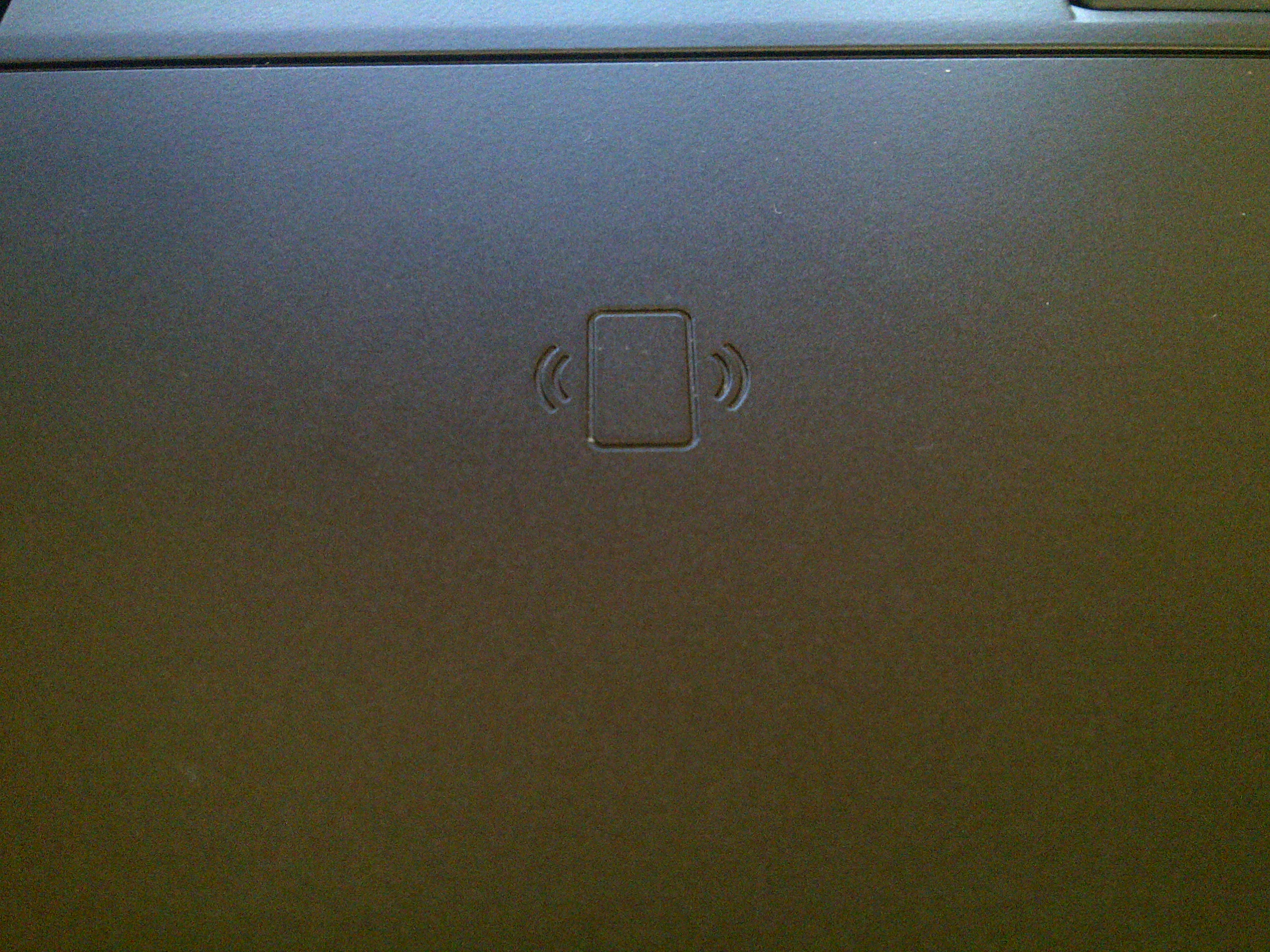
RFID (Optional) location on a Latitude E6410

Dell used the "E-series" name up through the 2016 models, and new 2017 models drop the "E." and Dell E-Port Replicator with it. Latitude computers are available in four series: the 3000, 5000, 7000, and 9000. The 3000 series is designed to be entry-level aimed at the education market and small businesses, This series did not exist prior to Haswell (xx40) as the Vostro Series was consolidated into the Latitude lineup to form the 3000 series. The 5000 series is mid-range. It includes a high-performance subseries whose model designations end in 1. These devices are available with higher-TDP (45w) processors, discrete graphics and NVMe SSDs. The 6000 series sat above the 5000 series. The 7000 series consists of high-end Ultrabook computers, introduced in 2014 with the Latitude E7440 and E7240 and replaced the existing high end 6000 series. The 9000 series was introduced in 2020 as an even more higher-end than the 7000 series. Mobile workstation versions of Latitude used 5000 series instead of 6000 series.

Aside from the 3000, 5000, 7000, and 9000 series, Dell also provides an Education and Rugged Series of Latitude computers. The Education series laptops are designed for use in educational institutions and are geared towards office and internet based applications. The Rugged series laptops are similar to the previous Latitude XFR computers. They are designed with extra durability in mind.

=== xx50 Models (2024) ===
Dell announced xx50 models on February 26, 2024.

- 9450
- 7650
- 7455 (Qualcomm Snapdragon X: Plus X1P-64-100 / Plus X1P-64-100)
- 7450 (1st Series Intel Core Ultra 5 135U vPro / Ultra 7 165U vPro)
- 7450 Ultralight
- 7350
- 7350 Ultralight
- 7350 Detachable : Successor to 7320 Detachable
- 5550
- 5455: (Qualcomm Snapdragon X: Plus X1P-64-100 / Elite X1P-42-100)
- 5450
- 5350
- 3550
- 3450

=== xx40 Models (2023) ===
Dell announced xx40 models on March 23, 2023.

- 9440 2-in-1 14"
- 7640 first 16" 16:10 Latitude model
- 7440 (13th gen Intel Core i5-1335U / i5-1345U vPro)
- 7440 Ultralight
- 7340
- 7340 Ultralight
- 5540
- 5440 (13th gen Intel Core i5 / i7)
- 5340: Laptop or 2-in-1, 13.3" display
- 3540
- 3440
- 3340
- 3140 2-in-1 11.6" Intel N100 or N200

=== xx30 Models (2022) ===
Dell announced xx30 models on March 31, 2022.

- 9430 2-in-1 14" (12th gen Intel Core i5/i7-1245U)
- 9330 2-in-1 13" (first of its size)
- 7530: 15.6"
- 7430: 14"
- 7330: 13.3"
- 7330 Ultralight: 13.3"
- 5530: 15.6"
- 5531: 15.6"
- 5430: 14"
- 5431: 14"
- 5330: 13"
- 3530: 15.6"
- 3430: 14"
- 3330 2-in-1: 13.3"
- 3330: 13.3"

=== xx20 Models (2021) ===
Dell announced xx20 models at CES 2021.

- 9520: 15.6" (11th gen Intel Core i5/i7)
- 9420: 14" (11th gen Intel Core i5/i7)
- 7520: 15.6"
- 7420: 14"
- 7320: 13.3"
- 7320 Detachable: 13.3"
- 5520: 15.6" with Intel's low power CPU (10 gen Core i5/i7, 11 gen Core i3/i5/i7)
- 5521: 15.6" with Intel's high power CPU (11 gen Core i5/i7)
- 5420: 14"
- 5421: 14"
- 5320: 13.3"
- 3520: 15.6"
- 3420: 14"
- 3320: 13.3"
- 3120: 11.6"

=== xx10 Models (2020) ===
- 9510 2-in-1: 15.0" Lightweight 2-in-1
- 9510: 15.0" Lightweight
- 9410 2-in-1: 14.0" Lightweight 2-in-1
- 7410 2-in-1: 14.0" Ultraportable 2-in-1
- 7410: 14.0" Ultraportable
- 7310 2-in-1: 13.3" Ultraportable 2-in-1
- 7310: 13.3" Ultraportable
- 7210 2-in-1: 12.3" Detachable 2-in-1
- 5510: 15.6" Mainstream
- 5511: 15.6" High Performance (10th gen Core i7)
- 5410: 14.0" Mainstream
- 5411: 14.0" High Performance
- 5310 2-in-1: 13.3" Mainstream 2-in-1
- 5310: 13.3" Mainstream
- 3510: 15.6" Essential
- 3410: 14.0" Essential
- 3310 2-in-1: 13.3" Essential 2-in-1
- 3310: 13.3" Education

=== xx00 Models (2019) ===
- 7400 2-in-1: 14.0" Ultraportable 2-in-1
- 7400: 14.0" Ultraportable
- 7300: 13.3" Ultraportable
- 7200 2-in-1: 12.3" Detachable 2-in-1
- 5501: 15.6" High-Performance
- 5500: 15.6" Mainstream
- 5401: 14.0" High-Performance (9th gen Core i5/i7 H series, Nvidia MX150 as an optional GPU)
- 5400: 14.0" Mainstream (8th gen Core i5)
- 5300 2-in-1: 13.3" Mainstream 2-in-1
- 5300: 13.3" Mainstream
- 3500: 15.6" Essential
- 3400: 14.0" Essential (Celeron-4305U, 8th Gen Core i3-8145U/i5-8265U-8365U/i7-8565U)
- 3301: 13.3" Essential
- 3300: 13.3" Education

=== xx90 Models (2018) ===
- 7490: 14.0" Ultraportable (7th gen Core i3, 8th gen Core i5/i7)
- 7390: 13.3" Ultraportable (7th gen Core i3/i5, 8th gen Core i5/i7)
- 7390 2-in-1: 13.3" Ultraportable 2-in-1 (8th gen Core i3, 8th gen Core i5/i7)
- 7290: 12.5" Ultraportable (7th gen Core i3/i5, 8th gen Core i5/i7)
- 5591: 15.6" High-Performance (8th gen Core i5/i7)
- 5590: 15.6" Mainstream (7th gen Core i3/i5, 8th gen Core i5/i7)
- 5491: 14.0" High-Performance (8th gen Core i5/i7)
- 5490: 14.0" Mainstream (7th gen Core i3/i5, 8th gen Core i5/i7)
- 5495: 14.0" Mainstream (AMD Ryzen Pro Mobile: 3 2300U, 5 2500U, 7 2700U)
- 5290: 12.5" Mainstream (8th gen Core i5/i7)
- 5290 2-in-1: 12.3" Mainstream 2-in-1 (7th gen Core i3/i5, 8th gen Core i5/i7)
- 3590: 15.6" Essential (7th gen Celeron/Core i3/i5, 8th gen Core i5/i7)
- 3490: 14.0" Essential (6th gen Celeron-3865U, Core i3-6606U 7th gen Core i3-7130U/i5-7200U, 8th gen Core i5-8250U-8350U/i7-8550U)
- 3390 2-in-1: 13.3" Essential 2-in-1 (7th gen Pentium/Core i3, 8th gen Core i5)

14.0" Dell Latitude 5480 (2017)

=== xx80 Models (2017) ===
- 7480: 14.0" Ultraportable (7th gen Core i3/i5/i7)
- 7389: 13.3" 2-in-1 Ultraportable (7th gen core i3/i5/i7)
- 7380: 13.3" Ultraportable (7th gen Core i3/i5/i7)
- 7285: 12.3" Convertible Ultraportable (7th gen Core m3/m5/m7)
- 7280: 12.5" Ultraportable (7th gen Core i3/i5/i7)
- 5580: 15.6" Mainstream (7th gen Core i5/i7)
- 5480: 14.0" Mainstream (7th gen Core i5/i7)
- 5289: 12.5" Ultraportable 2-in-1, (7th gen Core i3/i5/i7)
- 5285: 12.3" Convertible Ultraportable, detachable keyboard (7th gen Core i3/i5/i7)
- 5280: 12.5" Mainstream (7th gen Core i5/i7)
- 3580: 15.6" Essential (7th gen Celeron/Core i3/i5/i7)
- 3480: 14.0" Essential (6th gen i3-6006U/i5-6200U 7th gen Celeron-3865U, Core i3-7100U/i5-7200U-7300U/i7-7500U)
- 3380: 13.3" Essential (7th gen Celeron/Core i3/i5/i7)
- 3189: 11.6" Education Convertible 2-in-1 (Pentium N4200 Intel 7265, Celeron N3350)
- 3180: 11.6" Education (Celeron N3350)

== Previous models ==
A Dell Latitude E6400 XFR running Linux Mint.

=== Exx70 Models (2016) ===
- E7470: 14.0" Ultraportable (6th gen Core i3/i5/i7)
- E7270: 12.5" Ultraportable (6th gen Core i3/i5/i7)
- 7370: 13.3" Ultraportable (6th gen Core m3/m5/m7)
- 7275: 12.5" Convertible Ultraportable (6th gen Core m3/m5/m7)
- E5570: 15.6" Mainstream (6th gen Core i5/i7)
- E5470: 14.0" Mainstream (6th gen Core i5/i7)
- E5270: 12.5" Mainstream (6th gen Core i5/i7)
- 5175/9: 10.8" Ultraportable 2-in-1 (6th gen Core m5/m7)
- 3570: 15.6" Essential (6th gen Celeron/Core i3/i5/i7)
- 3470: 14.0" Essential (6th gen Celeron/Core i3/i5/i7)
- 3370: 13.3" Essential (6th gen Core i3)
- 3379: 13.3" Essential 2-in-1 (6th gen Core i3/i5)

=== Exx50 Models (2015) ===
- E7450: 14.0" Ultraportable (5th gen Core i3/i5/i7)
- Latitude 13 7350: 13.3" Convertible Ultraportable 2-in-1 Tablet (5th gen Core M)
- E7250: 12.5" Ultraportable (5th gen Core i3/i5/i7)
- E5550: 15.6" Mainstream (5th gen Core i3/i5/i7)
- E5450: 14.0" Mainstream (5th gen Core i3/i5/i7)
- E5250: 12.5" Mainstream (5th gen Celeron/Core i3/i5/i7)
- E3550: 15.6" Essential (5th gen Celeron/Core i3/i5/i7)
- E3450: 14.0" Essential (5th gen Celeron/Core i3/i5/i7)

=== Exx40 Models (2013/2014) ===
- E7440: 14.0" Ultraportable (4th gen Core i3/i5/i7 ULV)
- E7240: 12.5" Ultraportable (4th gen Core i3/i5/i7 ULV)
- E6540: 15.6" Mainstream (4th gen Core i3/i5/i7 Mobile)
- E6440: 14.0" Mainstream (4th gen Core i3/i5/i7 Mobile)
- E5540: 15.6" Mainstream (4th gen Core i3/i5/i7 ULV)
- E5440: 14.0" Mainstream (4th gen Core i3/i5/i7 ULV)
- E3540: 15.6" Essential (4th gen Core i3/i5/i7 ULV)
- E3440: 14.0" Essential (4th gen Core i3/i5/i7 ULV)

=== Exx30 Models (2012/2013) ===
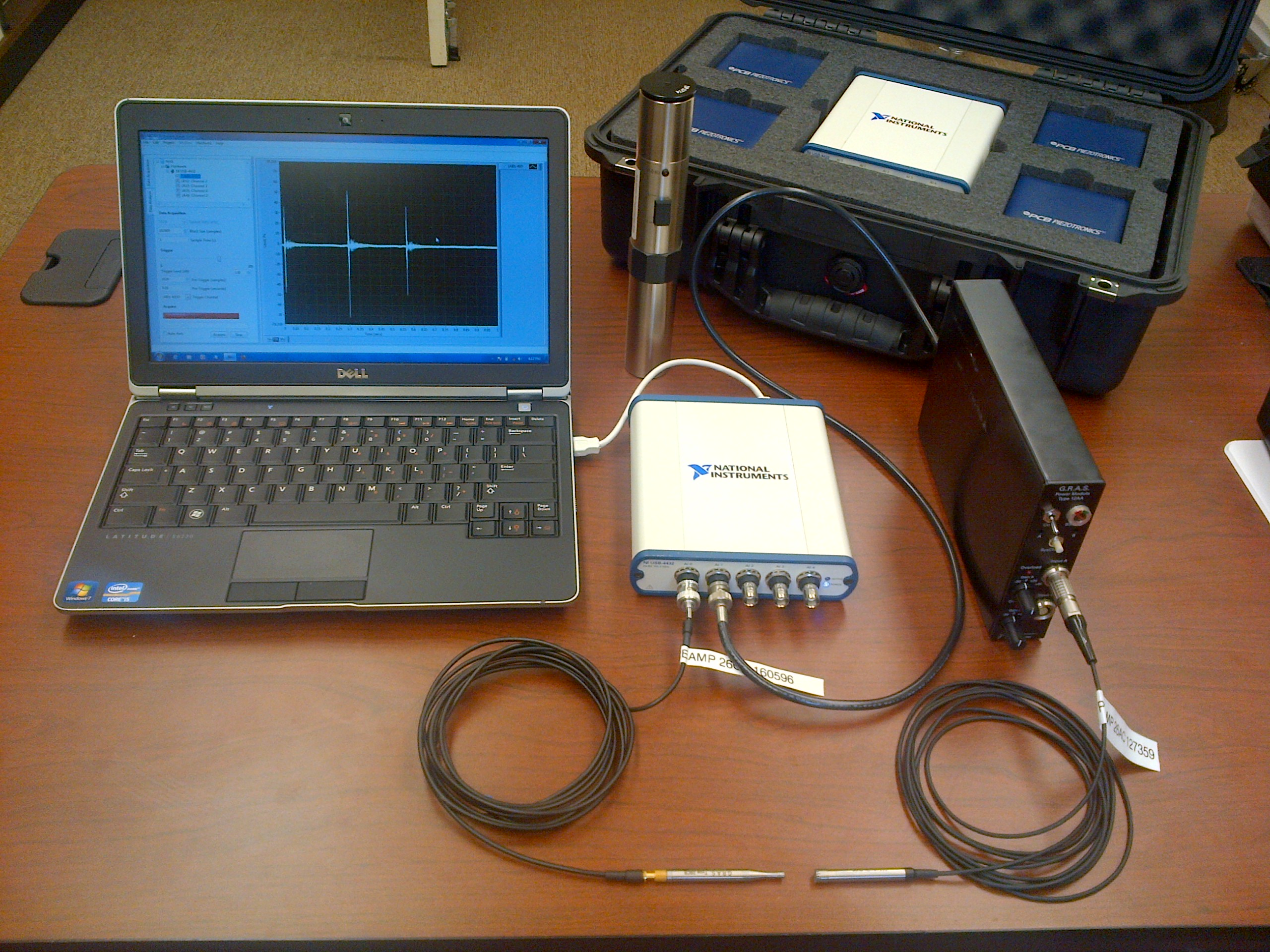
Latitude E6230 (in use with noise measurement tool)

- E6530: 15.6" Mainstream (3rd gen Core i3/i5/i7)
- E6430: 14.0" Mainstream (3rd gen Core i3/i5/i7)
- E6330: 13.3" Mainstream (3rd gen Core i3/i5/i7)
- E6230: 12.5" Mainstream (3rd gen Core i3/i5/i7)
- E5530: 15.6" Essential (3rd gen Core i3/i5/i7)
- E5430: 14.0" Essential (2nd gen core i3) or (3rd gen Core i3/i5/i7)
- 6430u: 14.0" Ultraportable (3rd gen Core i3/i5/i7)

=== Exx20 Models (2011/2012) ===
- E6520: 15.6" Mainstream (2nd gen Core i3/i5/i7)
- E6420: 14.0" Mainstream (2nd gen Core i3/i5/i7)
- E6320: 13.3" Ultraportable (2nd gen Core i3/i5/i7)
- E6220: 12.5" Ultraportable (2nd gen Core i3/i5/i7)
- E5520: 15.6" Essential (2nd gen Core i3/i5/i7)
- E5420: 14.0" Essential (2nd gen Core i3/i5/i7)
- E5520m: 15.6" Value (Celeron/Core2Duo)
- E5420m: 14.0" Value (Celeron/Core2Duo)
- E6420 XFR: 14.0" Fully Rugged (2nd gen Core i5/i7)
- E6420 ATG: 14.0" Semi-Rugged (2nd gen Core i5/i7)

=== Exx10 Models (2010/2011) ===
- E6510: 15.6" Mainstream (1st gen Core i3/i5/i7)
- E6410: 14.1" Mainstream (1st gen Core i3/i5/i7)
- E6410 ATG: 14.1" Semi-Rugged (1st gen Core i5/i7)
- E5510: 15.6" Essential (1st gen Core i3/i5/i7)
- E5410: 14.1" Essential (1st gen Core i3/i5/i7)
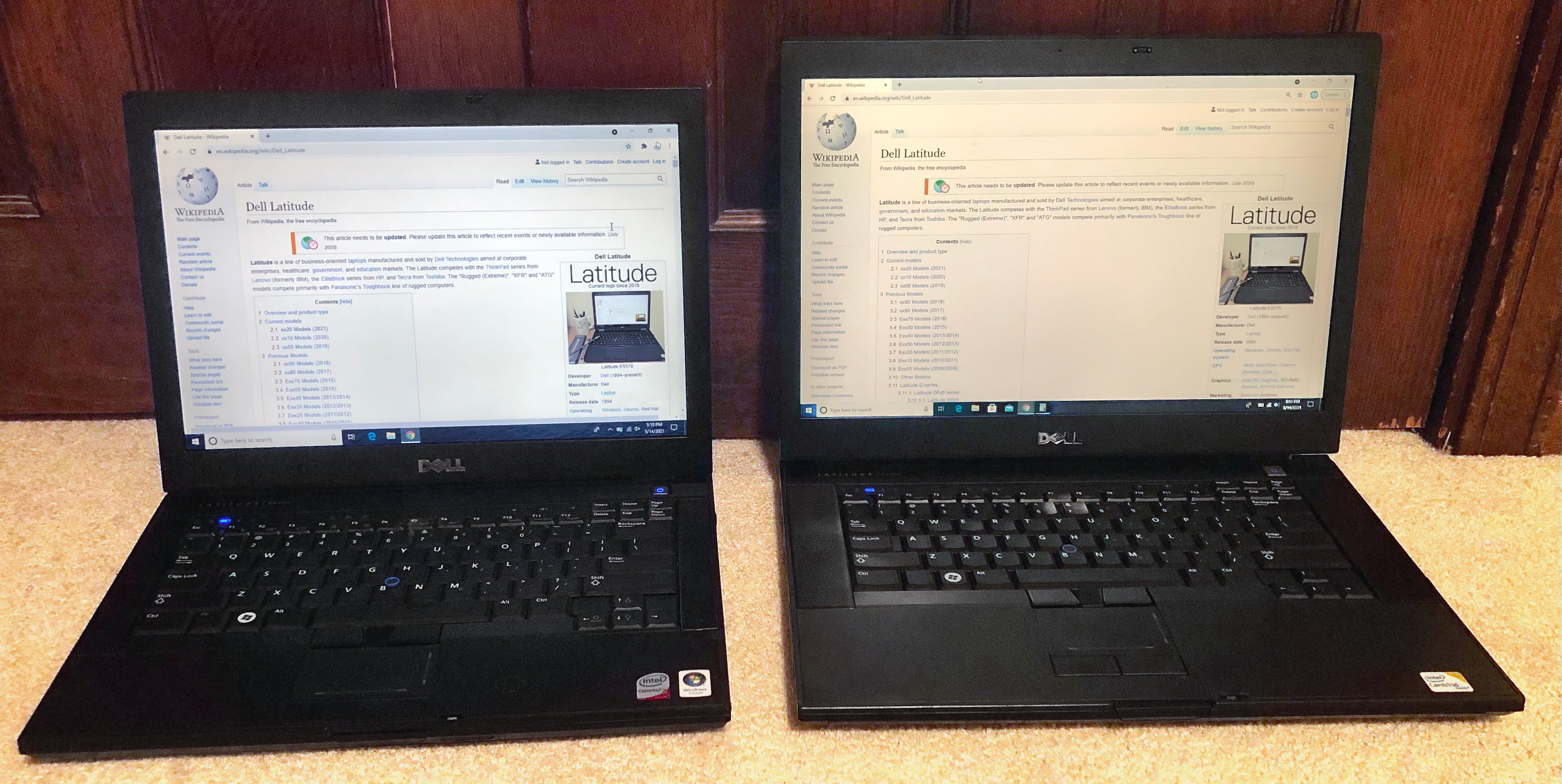
  Dell Latitude e6500 (right) next to a Latitude e6400, running Windows 10
- E4310: 13.3" Ultraportable (1st gen Core i3/i5/i7)

=== Exx00 Models (2008/2009) ===
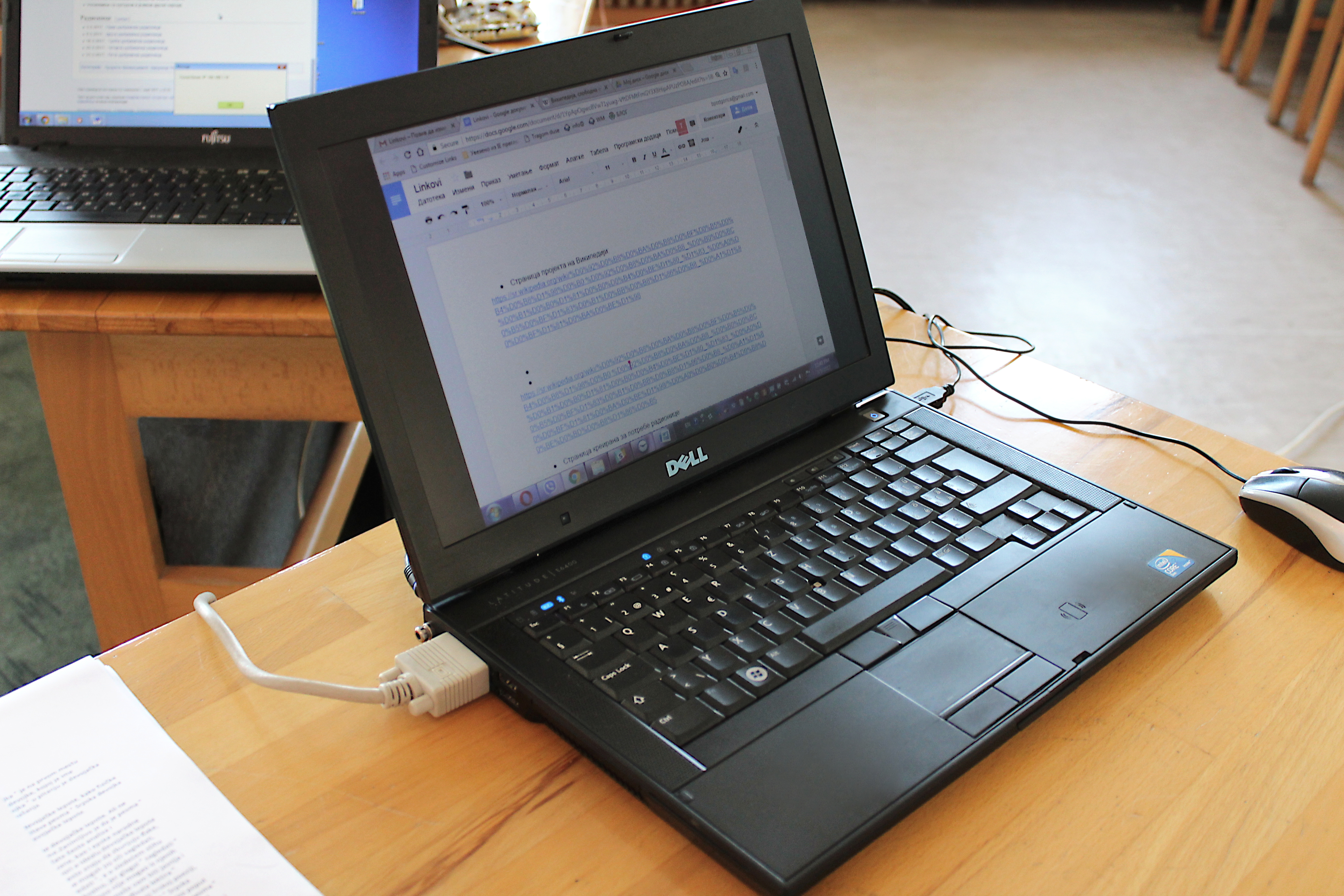
Latitude E6400

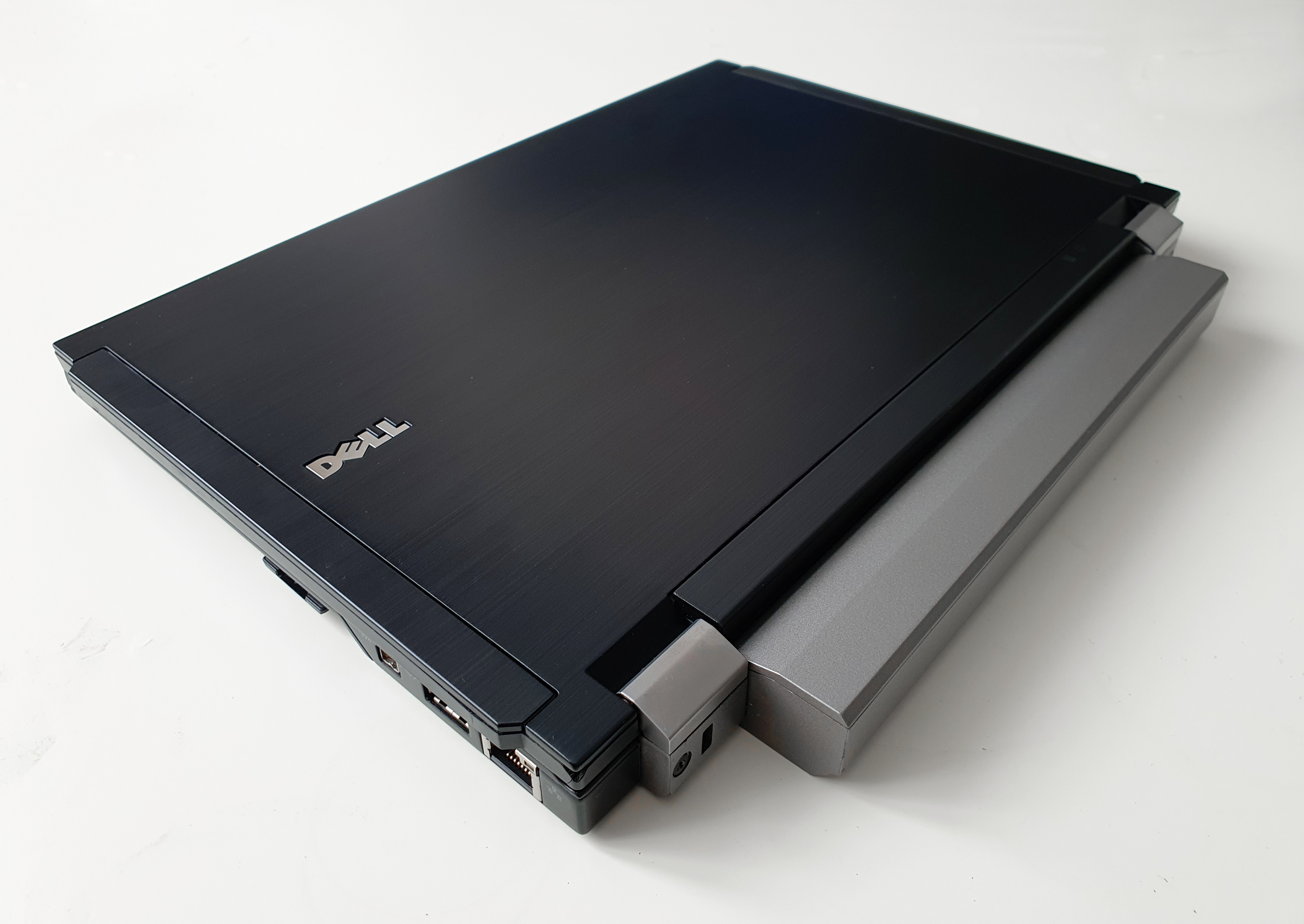
Dell Latitude E4200

- E6500: 15.4" Mainstream (Core 2 Duo)
- E6400: 14.1" Mainstream (Core 2 Duo)
- E6400 ATG: 14.1" Semi-Rugged (Core 2 Duo)
- E6400 XFR: 14.1" Fully Rugged (Core 2 Duo)
- E5500: 15.4" Essential (Celeron/Core 2 Duo)
- E5400: 14.1" Essential (Core 2 Duo)
- E4300: 13.3" Ultraportable (Core 2 Duo)
- E4200: 12.1" Ultraportable (Core 2 Duo)

=== Other Models ===
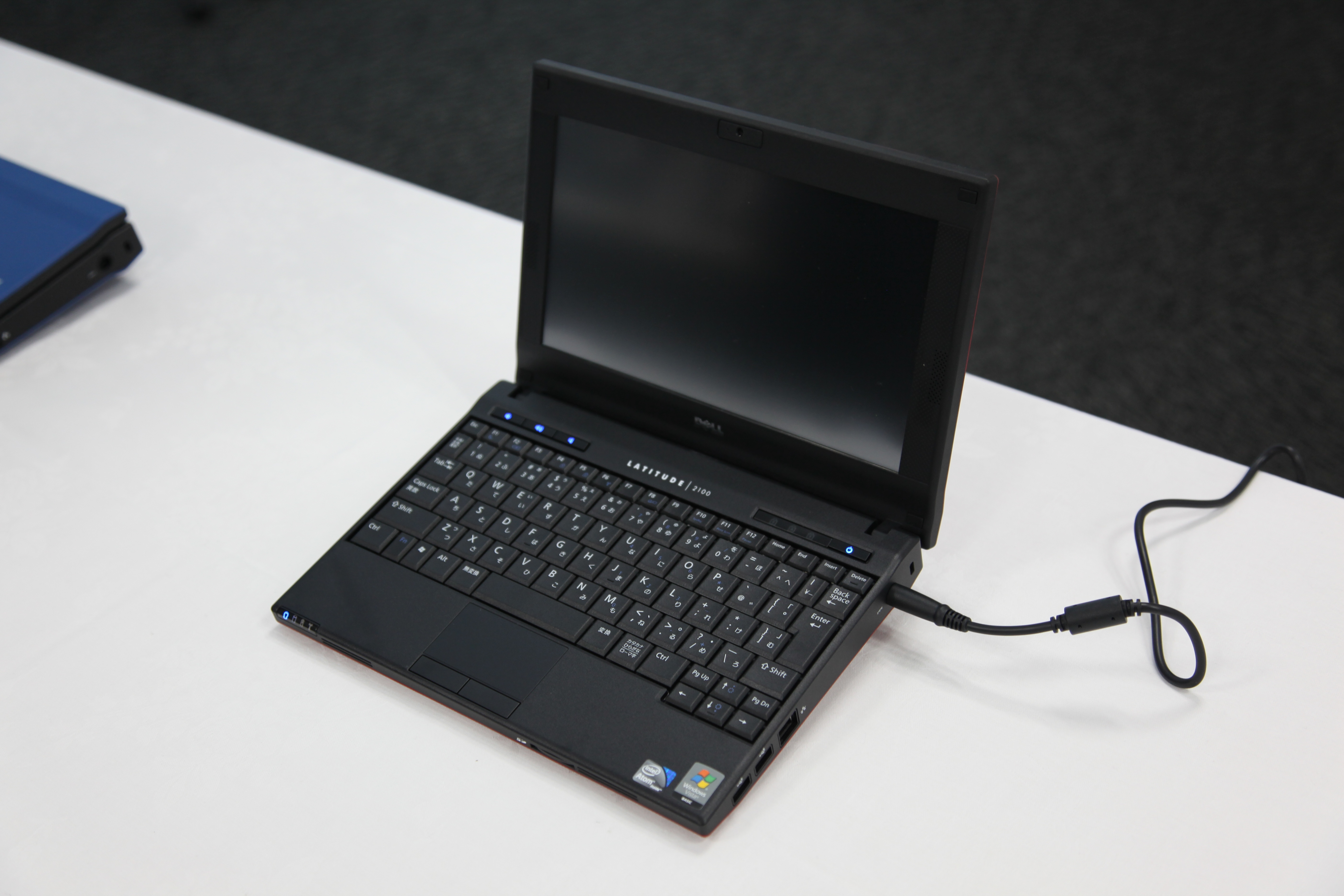
Latitude 2100

- XT3: 13.1" Convertible Touch Tablet & Pen (Core i3/i5/i7) –Release Date: August 2011
- XT2: 12.1" Convertible Touch Tablet & Pen (Core 2 Duo ULV)
- XT2 XFR: 12.1" Convertible Touch Tablet & Pen –Fully Rugged (Core 2 Duo ULV)
- XT: 12.1" Convertible Touch Tablet & Pen (Core 2 Duo ULV) -Released around late 2007
- 2100 10.1" Netbook
- 2110 10.1" Netbook
- 2120 10.1" Netbook
- Z 16.0" Thin and Light

=== Latitude D-series ===
The Latitude D-series was introduced in 2003, and discontinued in 2007. The models are the D4x0 (12.1" Ultra Mobile), D5x0 (14.1 or 15.0" standard aspect screen except for D531, plastic case, value model), D6x0 (14.1" Corporate model) and D8x0 (15.4" high-resolution model) most models are based on the Intel Core 2 Duo and the Intel Santa Rosa chipset, with the exception being the D531. Ever since the D420, D620, and D800, the D-series features wide-aspect LCD screens: 12.1", 14.1", and 15.4" respectively.

==== Latitude D6x0 series ====
The Latitude D6x0 series is the 14"/14.1" corporate model. It aims to combine heavy-duty power with reasonable portability, and differs primarily from D8x0 series in screen size. All are two spindle designs, with a "D/bay" modular bay which can interchange optical drives, a second hard drive, a floppy disk, a Zip drive, or a second battery. All models have a smart card socket, PCMCIA socket, 9-pin serial port, a "D-dock" port for a docking station or port replicator, and have an internal socket for an 802.11 wireless card.

The D600 and D610 share a common form factor, battery socket, and have a parallel printer port.

The D620 and D630 share a common form factor, battery socket, and do not have a parallel printer port. Both have support for an optional internal Bluetooth module, a socket for an optional mobile broadband card, and have an external switch for disabling any wireless connections.

===== Latitude D600 =====
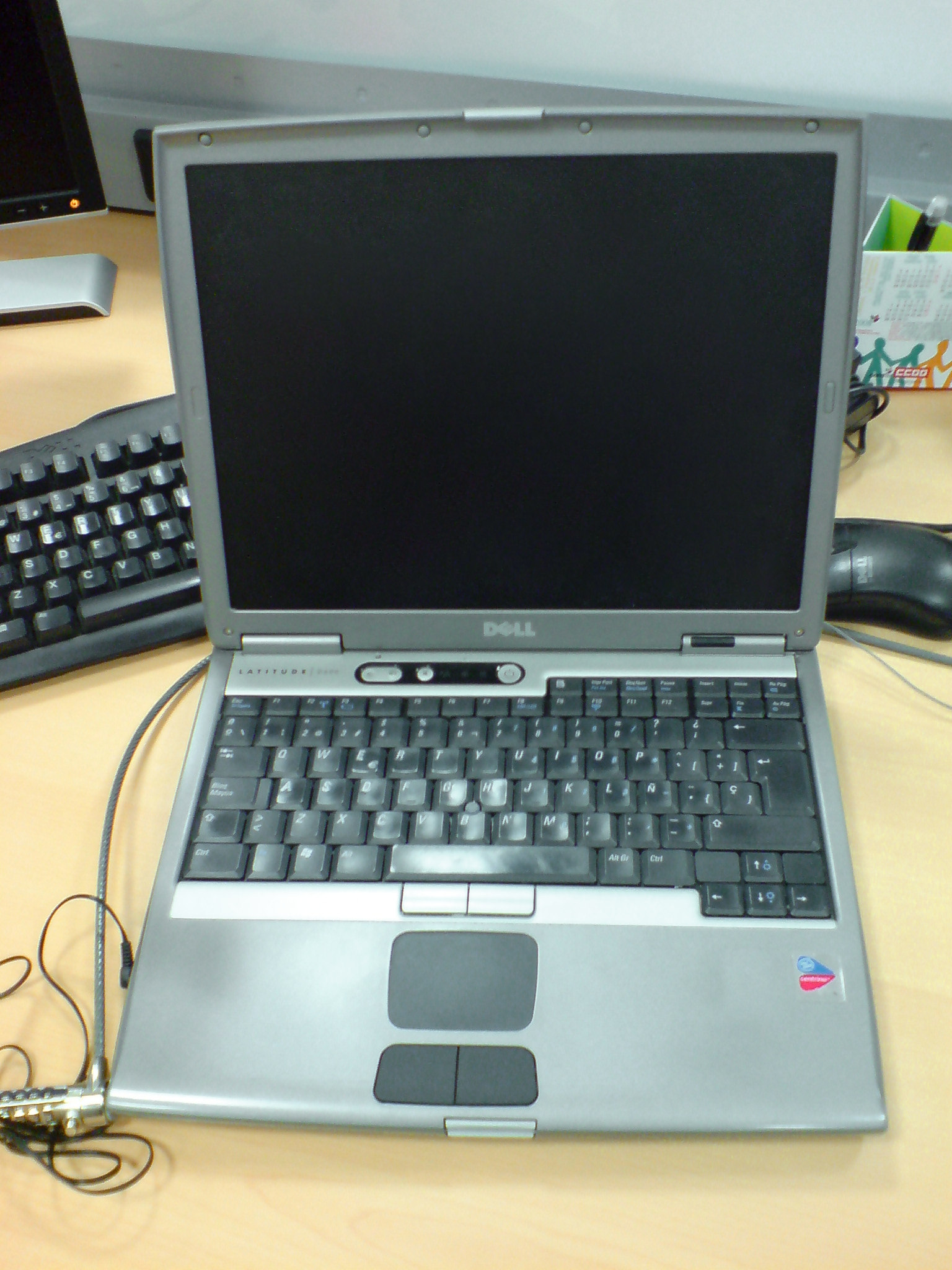
Latitude D600

The D600 (and simultaneously introduced D800) was released on March 12, 2003. These were Dell's first laptops in the Latitude D-series, and also Dell's first business-oriented notebooks based on the Pentium-M (first-generation "Banias" or Dothan) chips and running on a 400 MT/s FSB on DDR memory. It had a PATA hard drive and a D-series modular bay, and used an ATI Radeon 9000 GPU. It had a 14-inch screen, in regular (non-widescreen) form factor. Unlike later D6x0 series machines, both memory sockets were accessible from a single cover on the bottom of the system.

Most, if not all Latitude models prior to the Latitude Dx20 series had a near-clone Inspiron, in the case of the D600, it was the Inspiron 600M. Differences include that the 600M does not work with the Dell D-Dock, and the case styling is slightly different. The motherboards, screens, and hard drive caddies are all physically interchangeable.

The Latitude D600 used a PA-10/PA-12 charger and came with a DVD drive, 2 x USB, 1 x TV, 1 x network, 1 x parallel, 1 x serial, and 1 monitor output. The hard drive is accessible through a cover on the left-hand front side of the lower case and is secured by 1 screw. After removing the screw, the hard drive can then slide out.

===== Latitude D610 =====
The D610 (released in 2005) was an update of the D600 design; it used a slightly modified D600 chassis, an extra 2 USB ports, and a newer Pentium M chipset ("Sonoma" with 533 MT/s FSB). This chipset was the first Intel mobile chipset to use DDR2 Memory, versus the DDR in the Latitude Dx00 series. For space-saving purposes, instead of having both RAM chips on the bottom of the laptop, one RAM slot was moved to the top of the motherboard which could be accessed by removing the keyboard, whereas the other RAM slot remained in the area it had been located at previously. Unlike the D600 and prior midrange Latitudes (The 6xx series, dating back to the C-series) you had a choice of standard integrated Intel Graphics (GMA 900), or a discrete ATI solution (Radeon X300).

====== Latitude D610 Audio-Out "whining" ======
Some Dell Latitude D610 units with a dedicated ATI X300 graphics card seem to have problems with the audio-out jack. Symptoms of this problem include a noise or whine when an audio device is connected to the audio-out jack. Up to this date Dell does not have a clear solution to this problem.

===== Latitude D620 =====
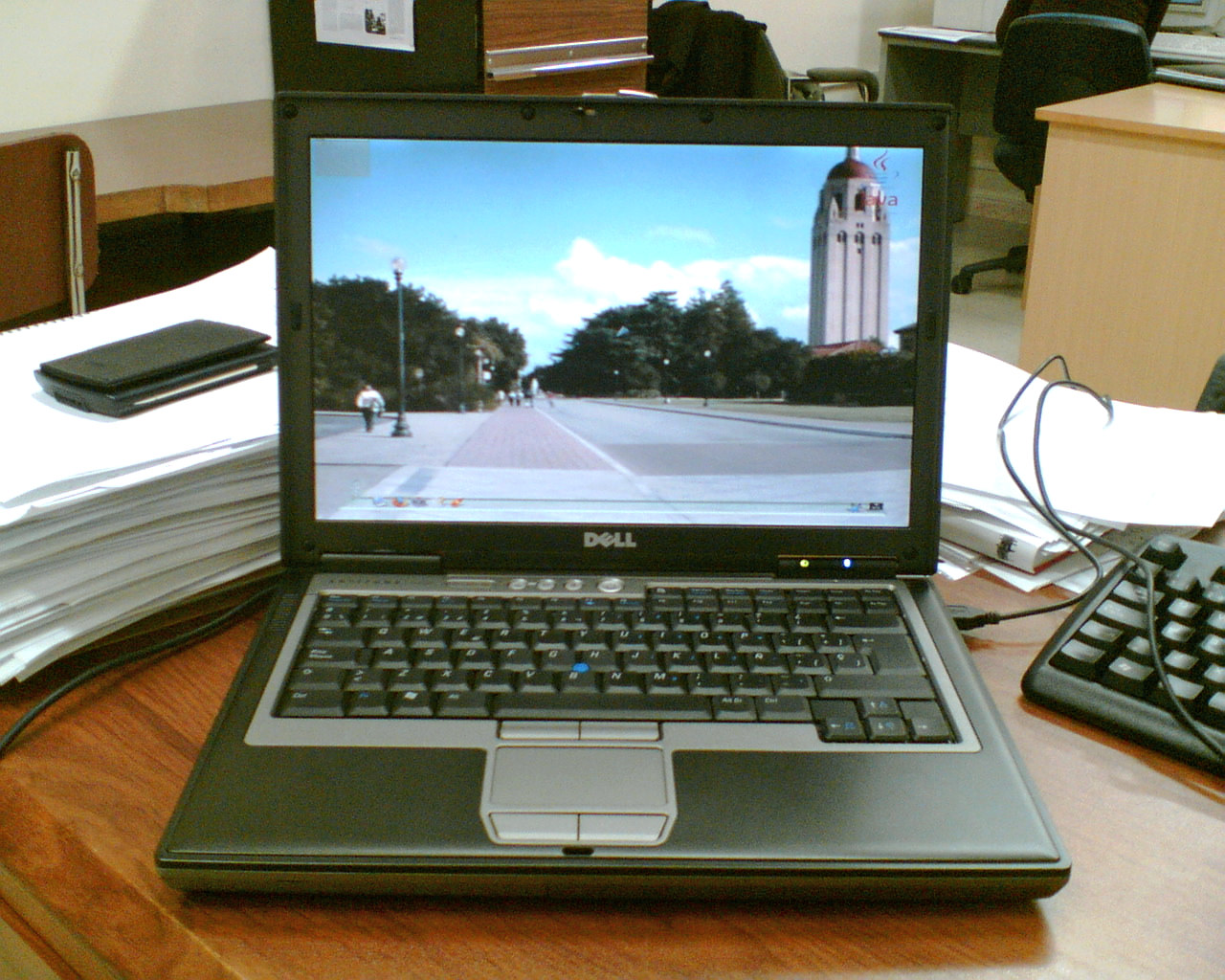
Latitude D620

In March 2006, Dell introduced the D620 (and the D820), its first business-oriented notebook with a dual-core processor available. The D620 marked the transition from strictly 32-bit processing to opening-up the potential to run 64-bit operating systems and applications. Initially available with the interim "Yonah" Core Duo (x86 32-bit) processors, it was later sold with the first-generation mobile "Merom" Core 2 (x86-64 64-bit) processor once those became available from Intel in the Fall of 2006; both run on a 667MT/s bus. So depending on the installed processor, a D620 can run x86-64 64-bit software. The D620 used a Socket-M for its motherboard and its CPU is possible to be upgraded. It was initially sold with Intel integrated graphics, but an option to upgrade to a discrete Nvidia GPU became available after a few months. It replaced the raised pointing stick with a "low profile" model and introduced the option of 4-cell and 9-cell batteries in addition to the standard 6-cell model. It uses DDR2 memory and is compatible with both PC2-4200 (533 MHz) and PC2-5300 (667 MHz) memory.

Although the D620 accepts a maximum of 4 GB of physical memory, it cannot be used fully, because of the 32-bit physical addressing limitation of the 945 Core 2 mobile chipsets [Intel-945GM/PM-chipset], (not related to the BIOS or the use of a 32-bit or 64-bit OS), restricts the usable memory by the operating system to 3.5 GB, or 3.3 GB with onboard video (memory is shared).

The D620 has one mono speaker located in the base below the touchpad. It has no option to expand to stereo without using external speakers or headphones.

There was no near-clone Inspiron model for the D620.

===== Latitude D630 =====
Released in 2007, the D630 is an update of the D620 design. It differed most significantly in being based on the newer "Santa Rosa" (GM/PM965) mobile chipset which supported the 800MT/s models of the mobile Core 2 Duo (both the Merom 7xx0 series and later the Penryn-based 8x00/9x00 series). It also had newer versions of the graphics processor options, support for Intel's "Turbo Memory" flash cache (although this uses the same card slot as the mobile broadband card), and support for internal Wireless-N. It also [optionally?] added a 4-pin Firewire IEEE 1394 port. It uses DDR2 memory and is compatible with PC2-5300 (667 MHz) and PC2-6400 (800 MHz) memory. The D630 unofficially will accept a maximum of 8 GB of physical memory, however, a BIOS update is required.

Unlike the D830, the D630 only has one speaker.

====== Latitude D620/D630 problems ======
- All early D620 models were known for faulty LCD screens. The early models suffered from light bleeding, where a black screen would show light bleeding in from the bottom of the screen. This wasn't fixed until almost a year into production.
- In addition, some D630 screens are known for having bad LCD pixels.
- They also have overheating issues: the D620/D630 and D820/D830 were available with an Intel integrated GMA or Nvidia graphics chip. The optional Nvidia graphics on this series of laptops are prone to overheating issues where the GPU would develop cracks in the solder. This was mostly due to temperature fluctuation but the graphics chips also ran much hotter than they were meant to. The failure manifests itself by stripes or "artifacts" on the LCD and also an external screen or by the total absence of an image. Even the D830 series, despite having more room for cooling the chip, suffered from the same issue. Some Nvidia models will eventually suffer from failure of the graphics chip due to the switch to lead-free solder and "underfill" of the BGA. The computer industry at the time had just switched to lead-free solders without redesigning cooling systems. This in turn led to undesirable heating cycles of the more brittle solder causing micro fractures to quickly form. Dell tried to prolong the lifetime of the Nvidia chips in these models with a BIOS update which causes the fan to run more often and thus reduce the strain from repeated heating/cooling cycles on the graphics chip. NVIDIA was found liable for these failures, causing a multi-million-unit recall, not only of some Dell notebooks, but also some HP, Compaq, and Apple products.

===== Latitude D630c =====
The D630c was a slight variant model of the D630, featuring a "manageable" version of the motherboard chipset unavailable on the standard D630.

Unlike the D630, the D630c model laptop could not be ordered with Intel graphics; it shipped only with the Nvidia graphics chip. As a result, all of the Latitude D630c laptops eventually fail.

It also could only be ordered with the Intel 4965AGN wireless card; it couldn't be configured with Dell's wireless options or lower end Intel wireless cards.

===== Latitude D631 =====
The Latitude D631 (released in 2007), similar to the D531, was a variant of the Latitude Dx30 series that had AMD processors instead of Intel. However, the D631 is very rare inside the United States due to it not being an option to order on Dell's website. You can find some that originated in the United States, but those were special ordered over the phone. They were sold alongside the D630 as standard equipment in select international countries, but while not being that rare internationally, they didn't sell as many units as the D630 series (and even the D630c series) laptops did. As a result, not much information about specific chipsets, graphics chip options (If there were any), or any other features can be found online for specifying details.

==== Latitude D8x0 series ====
The Latitude D8x0 series is the 15.4" corporate model; unlike the D600 and D610, all feature a widescreen form factor. All are two spindle (or "dual-spindle") designs, with a "D-bay" modular bay which can interchange optical drives, a floppy module, a second hard drive, or a second battery. All models have a smart card socket, PCMCIA socket, and 9-pin serial port, a "D-dock" port for docking station or port replicator, and have an internal socket for an 802.11 wireless card.

The D800 was Dell's first widescreen Latitude notebook.

The D8x0 series models roughly parallel the technology in the D6x0 models other than for screen size; they do not share a battery form factor with the D6x0 series. The D820 and D830 add an ExpressCard socket, not available in the D6x0 series. The D830 is capable of accepting 8 GB of physical memory with updated firmware.

The D800 equated to the Precision M60, and the D810 to the Precision M70. They were for all intents and purposes identical except for the graphics card, certification, and in the case of the M70, the lid.

The near-clone Inspirons for the D800 and D810 were the Inspiron 8500 and 8600; the D820 and D830 share hardware with Precision models M65 and M4300 respectively. There are even known cases of "mixed-mode" samples of the latter, where the Dell-recorded type according to the service tag and markings differs from the BIOS-reported type with an identical service tag.

Both Latitude D820 and D830 have stereo speakers mounted on both sides of the keyboard.

==== Latitude D5x0 series ====
The Latitude D500 series is a set of "entry-level" business models; they are built on a 15" non-widescreen form factor, although models before the D530 were sold with both 14.1- and 15-inch screens (the 14.1" having a wider bezel.) They are 2-spindle devices (removable optical drive interchangeable with D6xx/D8xx machines), and roughly follow the technical generations (chipset and processor-wise) of the D6x0 and D8x0 series. The D530 was Dell's last non-widescreen Latitude model.

The Latitude D531 was also available, being the cheapest Latitude available at the time due to using AMD processors and cutting back on a few features. It was essentially a D830 with, no TrackPoint, no smartcard reader, an option for a 14-inch screen (If this was chosen it would have a similar wider bezel as on the earlier D5xx series machines), and an AMD-based motherboard. It does keep some premium features from the D830, such as a magnesium chassis, support for a 2nd battery, and a SATA based interface for the hard drive, allowing people to upgrade to a much faster SSD for cheap. DVD Drives, Screen Assemblies (If the laptop was ordered with the 15-inch screen), RAM, and Hard Drives/Caddies were interchangeable.

==== Latitude D4x0 series ====
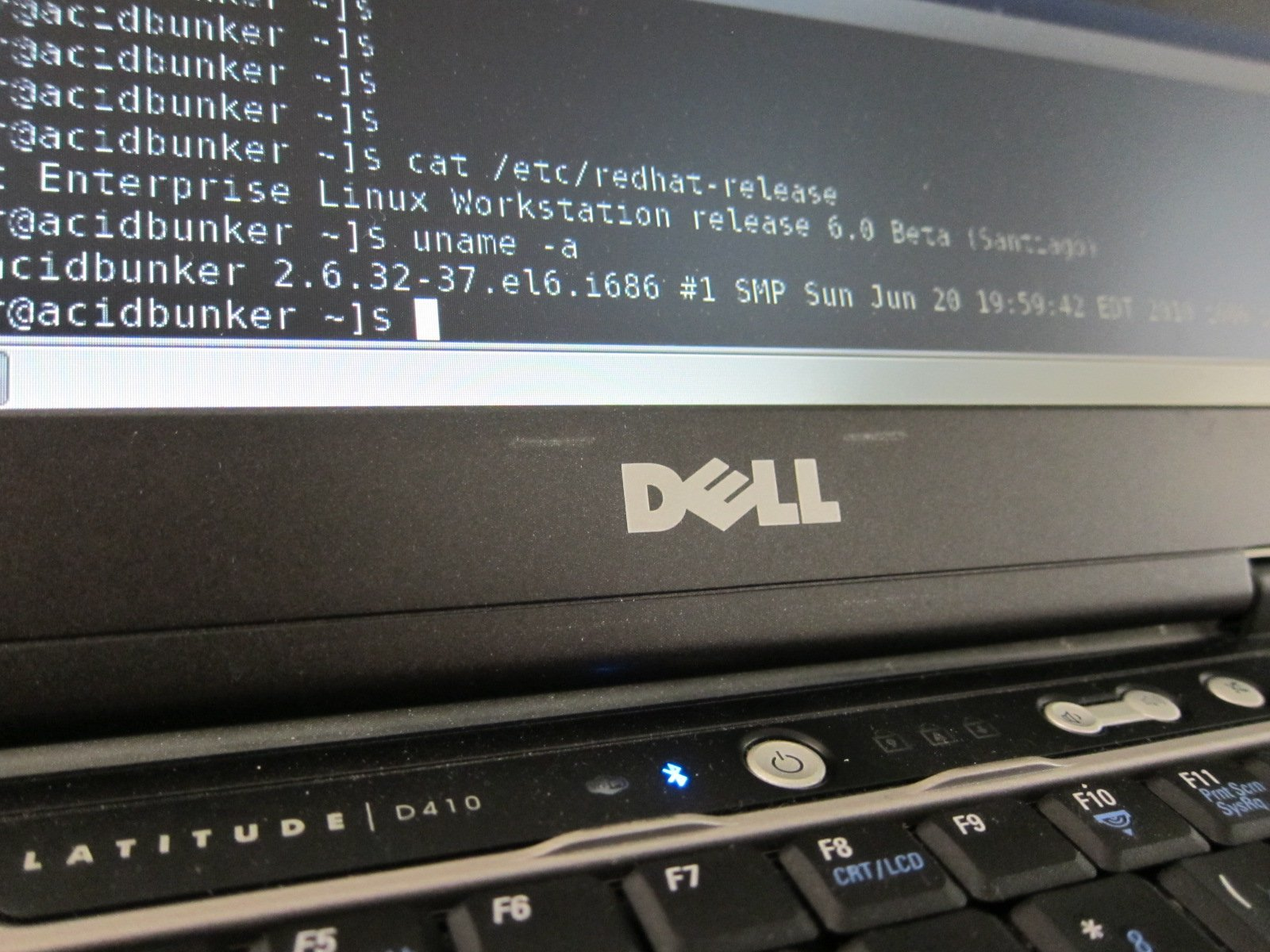
Latitude D410 running Red Hat Enterprise Linux

The Dell Latitude D4x0 series of ultraportable laptops were first released in 2003 with the D400 and discontinued in 2007 with the D430. In order to make the laptops small and lightweight, some changes were made, such as ultra low voltage (ULV) CPU's, removal of the modular bay, no dedicated graphics, and in later models, 1.8-inch hard drives instead of the industry standard 2.5 inch. While the D8x0, D6x0, and D5x0 models were all introduced simultaneously with each generation, the D4x0 series were generally introduced a couple of months after their counterparts. Also, since they use ULV (ultra-low-voltage) processors and chipsets, and are generally less powerful, the technology does not correspond as closely as it does between other models in each generation — for example, the D420/D430 uses parallel ATA hard drives (1.8") rather than the SATA (2.5") interface in the D520/620/820. In 2008, the D4x0 series was replaced by E4200 and E4300 models.

===== Dell Latitude D400/D410 =====
The D400 was released in 2003 with a ULV Banias Pentium M, Intel 855GM chipset, 128 MB of RAM (up to a max of 2 GB) and a choice of 20, 30, and 40 GB 4,200 RPM hard drives, The D400 had a design that was similar to the D600, including a 4:3 non widescreen 1,024×768 12" display. The computer could be configured with Windows XP Home or Professional, or Windows 2000 Professional.

The Dell Latitude D410 was released in 2005. It introduced a new design, newer ULV Dothan Pentium M's, and a Trusted Platform Module (TPM). It shares the rest of its hardware with the D400.

===== Dell Latitude D420/D430 =====
The Dell Latitude D420 was released in 2006 and introduced many new features. Some of them include support for Intel's new Core architecture, 12.1-inch widescreen displays, options for 3G cellular connectivity and a 64 GB SSD option. The D420 came with either an Intel Core Solo U1300 ULV 1.06 GHz, Intel Core Duo U2400 ULV 1.06 GHz or Intel Core Duo U2500 ULV 1.2 GHz. Unlike its bigger D620 brother, the D420's CPU was a soldered-in BGA and therefore is not upgradable. The Dell Latitude D420/D430 use 1.8-inch hard drives similar to those used in the Apple iPod Classic.

The D430 came out a year later in 2007, and was the last laptop in the D4x0 line. The D430 came with either an Intel Core Solo U1400 ULV 1.2 GHz or Intel Core 2 Duo U7600 1.2 GHz; the U7700 Processor (1.33 GHz) was later made available as an option. The D430 also have soldered-in BGA CPU's and are not upgradable without changing the motherboard.

In a 22 °C ambient the D430 U7700 processor has been measured to run from 62 °C at idle to 85 °C under heavy system loads, that is, within 10 °C of Intel's max. temperature rating for the processor.

==== D/Bay modules ====
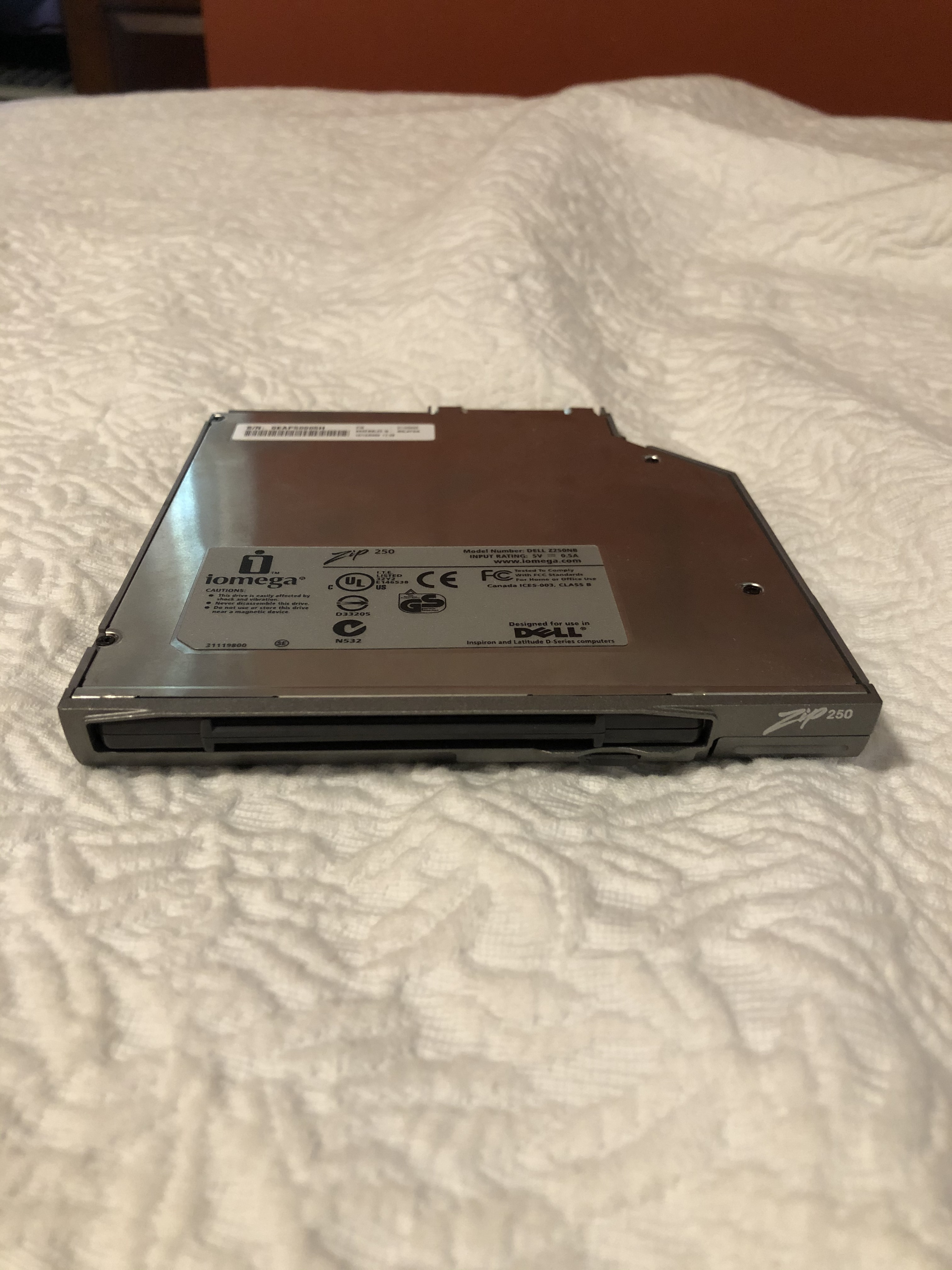
The Zip 250 module for the D/Bay

The Dell Latitude D-series laptops support swapping out the optical drive with select modules available from Dell. Available were a CD-ROM, DVD-ROM/CD-RW and a DVD±RW optical disk drives, along with a 2nd hard drive, 2nd battery, floppy drive and Iomega Zip 250 drive. An external enclosure branded as the D/Bay was available, allowing users to use modules on Latitudes that didn't have internal bays, such as the Latitude D4xx series of ultraportable laptops. The enclosure uses a special type of USB port only available on certain Latitudes(D4x0 series)

The Iomega Zip 250 module was released as the successor to the similar module for the Latitude C-series. When the modules came out in 2003, at the start of the D-series lifespan, Iomega was discontinuing the Zip format. As such, this module is very rare, and was only on sale for a few months after it came out. Newer Latitude laptops detect it as a CD-ROM drive within the BIOS, but within an operating system, the zip disks are detected as standard removable drives.

==== NVidia GPU problems ====
Many D620/D630 and D820/D830 models (and related Precision models) with NVidia mobile GPUs may experience graphics failure. A Class Action Lawsuit settlement by NVidia was reached where certain Dell models were provided with replacement motherboards at no expense.

==== Recall affecting D Series batteries ====
Dell posted notices to many of their laptop customers on August 14, 2006, saying that the Sony batteries on the D410, D500, D505, D510, D520, D600/D610, D620, and D800/D810 models were prone to bursting into flames, or even exploding.

The batteries on any of these computers purchased between April 2004 and July 18, 2006, were supposed to be removed and the computers run on AC power until replacements arrived. Problematic Sony batteries led to battery recall programs at other laptop companies, including Hitachi, Toshiba, Lenovo (IBM) and Apple.

=== Latitude C series ===
The Latitude C-series notebooks covered the range of processors from the Pentium 166 MHz to the Pentium 4-M. Models in this series included the CP (Pentium processors), CPi (Pentium II processors), CPx, CSx, C600 and C800 (Mobile Pentium III processors), CPt, C500 and C510 (Celeron processors), C400, C610 and C810 (Pentium 3-M processors) and C640 and C840 (Mobile Pentium 4-M).

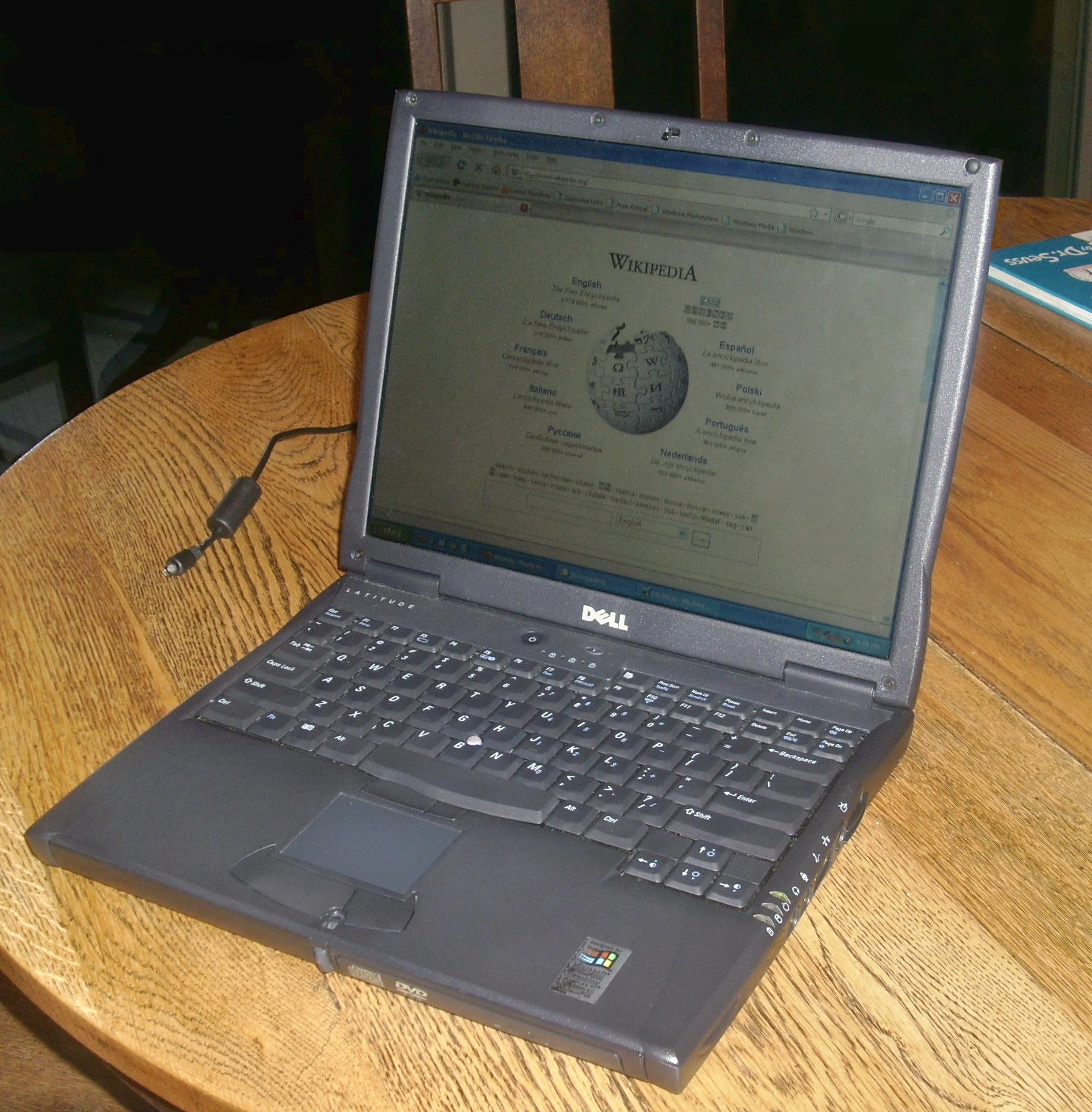
Latitude C500

C-series laptops were notable for their consistent and interchangeable accessories across this wide range of processors. The series was one of the first to offer the UXGA 1600×1200 resolution display, paired with a NVidia GeForce MX400 32 MB video accelerator. A robust design made it a favorite in harsher climates; however, this design lacked the visual appeal of many of its competitors.

The later C-series models mostly had near-clones sold as the Inspiron 4000 and 8000 series:

- C840 cloned as the Inspiron 8200 and Precision M50
- C810 cloned as the Inspiron 8100 and Precision M40
- C800 cloned as the Inspiron 8000
- C640 cloned as the Inspiron 4150
- C610 cloned as the Inspiron 4100
- C600 cloned as the Inspiron 4000
- CPxJ cloned as the Inspiron 3800
- CPxH cloned as the Inspiron 3700

The C840 was the last Dell notebook (along with its sister models the Inspiron 8200 and Precision M50) to have both a fixed optical drive and a modular bay, making it a "three-spindle" (or "tri-spindle") notebook. The modular bay could also be used for a second battery identical to the primary battery, rather than a special modular bay battery. It used a Pentium 4-M processor and DDR SDRAM. The Dell C840 can support up to one gigabyte of RAM in each of two slots, for a total of two gigabytes. The GPU can also be upgraded on the C840/M50/i8200, from a GeForce2 Go to the Quadro4 Go 700 from the Precision M50.

=== Rugged models ===
The Latitude ATG was a semi-rugged version of the D620, and was Dell's only semi-rugged offering, while their fully rugged offering originally consisted of the Augmentix XTG630, a D630 in a fully rugged case, and later the D630 XFR. The ATG as well as the XFR have a protective glass glued on top of the screen that often has glue leaking onto the display causing air bubbles to form.

=== Latitude XT series ===
The Latitude XT was a touch-screen convertible-tablet computer series.

==== Latitude XT ====
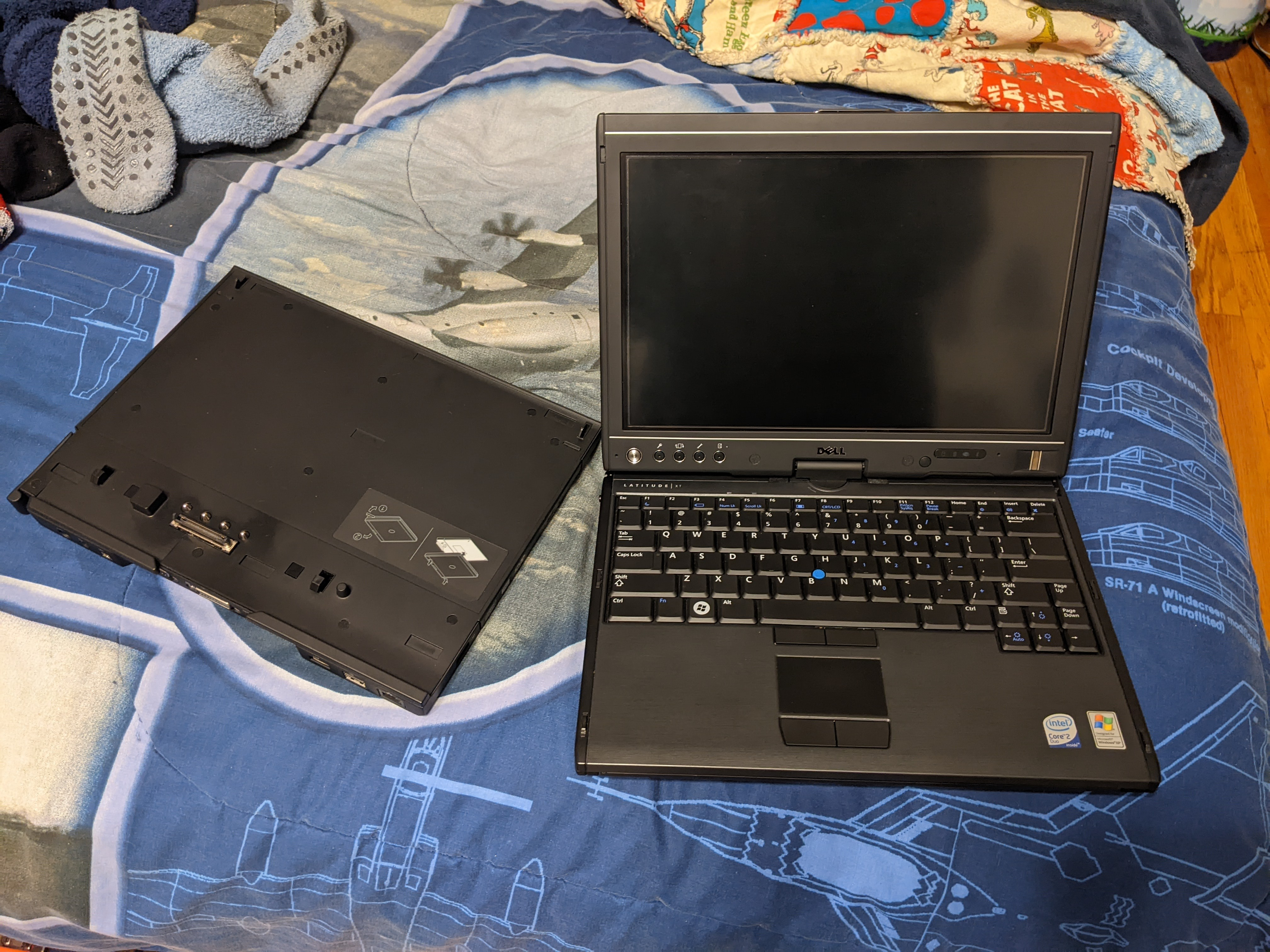
Latitude XT and its optional dock

In December 2007, Dell released their first tablet computer. It could have been purchased with an optional media base, which contained an optical drive and a few extra ports. It used a ZIF based hard drive, like the iPod classic. Originally it did not come with multi-touch, but in July 2008, Dell released multi-touch touch-screen drivers for the Latitude XT Tablet, claiming the "industry's first convertible tablet with multi-touch capabilities". Dell has partnered with N-trig, providers of DuoSense technology, combining pen, capacitive touch and multi-touch in a single device. N-trig's DuoSense dual-mode digitizer uses both pen and zero-pressure capacitive touch to provide a true hands-on computing experience for mobile computers and other digital input products over a single device. It features an integrated graphics solution based on the ATi Mobility Radeon X600, named the Radeon Xpress 1250.

===== Latitude XT problems =====
A large number of user reports suggest that the Dell Latitude XT suffers from a major problem. The N-Trig digitizer interfaces to the XT by an internal USB port. Users report that any other USB device which is plugged in may, and usually does, prevent the N-Trig applet (program which controls the features) from identifying the N-Trig hardware. In addition, there have been reports that certain other drivers, such as iTunes Helper, may cause this or a similar problem. Other users report no problems from iTunes. According to the reports, this still leaves the dual sense but without Multi-Touch and other advanced features, "which render the auto and dual mode useless. The digitizer will only start working again after consecutive reboots." There have also been reports that the driver may crash, catastrophically or non-catastrophically, leaving no screen input at all. A re-boot may solve the problem, but often users found that the driver installation is damaged, requiring a re-installation of the drivers. But the install program will not un-install if it doesn't recognize the N-Trig hardware. In this case, the alternatives are (1) restore the entire operating system from backup, (2) manually un-install by erasing all N-Trig programs and drivers then editing the registry to remove all references to N-Trig, then re-install the N-Trig software, or (3) do a complete re-install of Windows.

These problems have been reported both with XP and Vista, 32 and 64 bit. In addition, Dell sells a MediaBase with an internal DVD drive. The drive also interfaces by way of a USB connection inside the MediaBase. Most, but not all, users of the MediaBase report that it prevents the drivers from loading.

==== Latitude XT2 ====
Dell introduced the XT2 in February 2009. It was sold as a dual-mode computer with a screen that was able to be swiveled. It also featured a solid-state drive over the original XT's hard drive, which helped increase battery life. The improvements made with the N-Trig digitizer was mainly performance, not fixing its prevalent USB port or driver issues.

==== Latitude XT3 ====
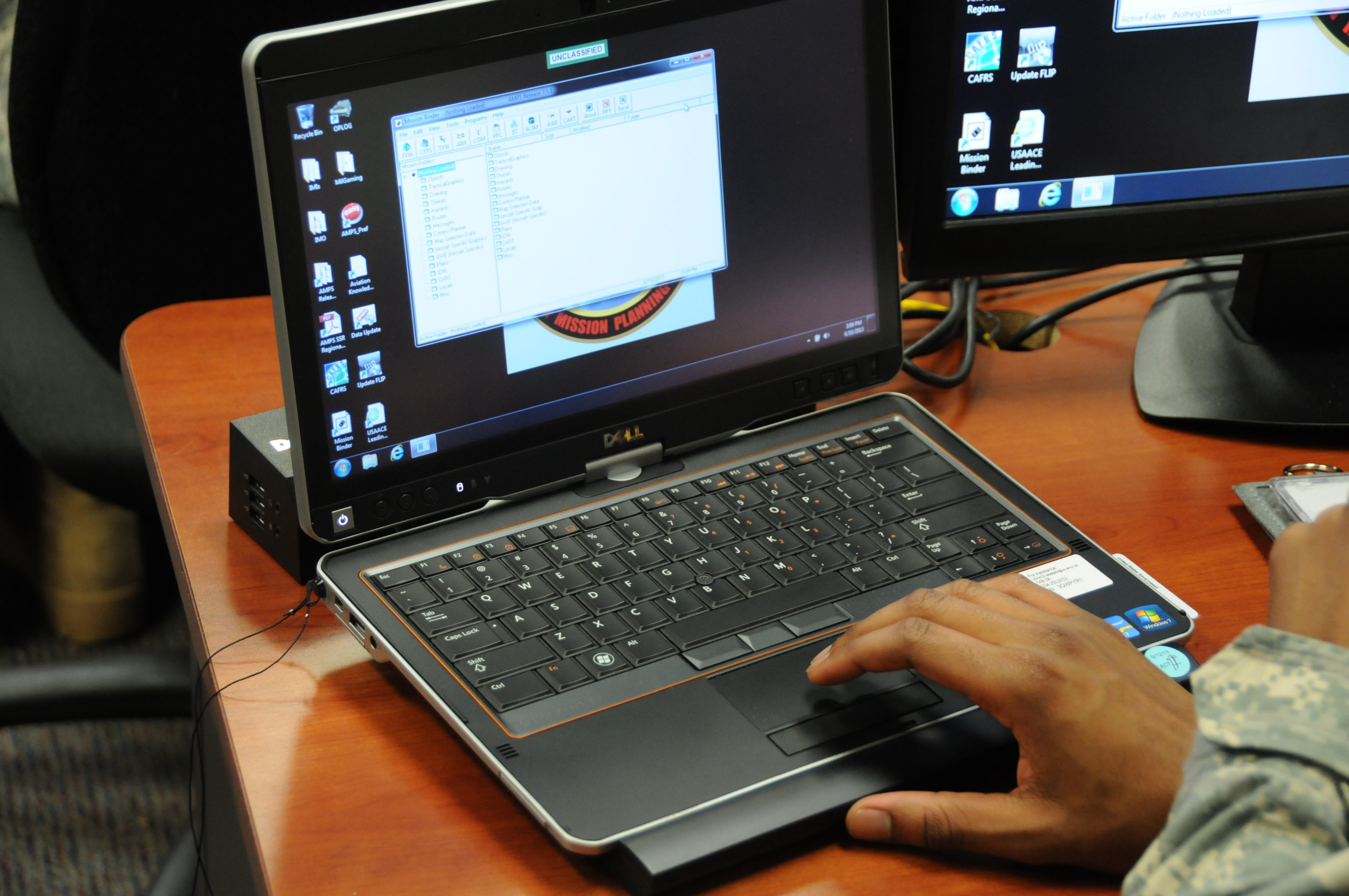
Latitude XT3 with dock

The XT3 was introduced in 2012. It was offered as a dual mode Tablet/Laptop with a screen that could be rotated and positioned so it could face the outside and had a touch screen. When the screen is positioned in tablet mode, the integrated keyboard and touchpad are covered, so the pointer must be used with the touchscreen and an onscreen keyboard for typing. The screen is 13.3in with a max resolution of 1366x768. A stylus pen was included that was concealed within the chassis when not in use. The chassis is a combination of a magnesium alloy that protected the corners and plastics covering the palmrest and bottom.

It was offered with 2nd generation Core i3, i5 and i7 processors and Intel integrated graphics. 4GB of DDR3 RAM were standard with support up to 8GB. It supported 3-cell and 6-cell ExpressCharge batteries and the option of a 9-cell that extended outside of the chassis. Windows 7 was pre-installed out of the box with options available for Home, Pro and Ultimate. Wireless connectivity included a Wireless-N Wifi card, Bluetooth and a WAN card for mobile data.

External ports included: RJ45, one 3.5in for headphones with microphone, 2 USB ports, 1 eSATA/USB port, HDMI, VGA, SecureCard, ExpressCard, and SD Card readers. A fingerprint reader was available on the palmrest. No CD/DVD slot is available, however a docking base was available for expanded USB ports and included the CD/DVD drive.

== Technical specifications ==
The majority of Latitude laptops are built to order.

Operating System: Windows, FreeDOS, or Ubuntu for some models.

Processor package

Socket
Soldered

Audio codec

Azalia\HD Audio
AC'97
Software AC'97

=== 3xxx, 5xxx, 7xxx, 9xxx Series (2017-2025) ===
Model	Release	CPU	Chipset	Memory		Graphics	Audio		Network card	Screen			Dimensions (mm)			Weight	Operating System
Model	Release	CPU	Chipset	Type	Maximum	Graphics	Audio codec	Audio interface	Network card	Type	Resolution	"	Height	Width	Depth	Weight	Operating System
Premium Ultrabook
9430	2022	12th Gen Intel Core Alder Lake 15w		LPDDR5	16, 32 GB (On board)	Intel Iris X^{e} Graphics	Realtek ALC711-CG	SoundWire with Universal audio jack, 4 speakers, subwoofer output supported and quad-array microphone	Intel AX211	LBL (low-blue light), anti-glare, 100% sRGB (1920×1200 models); LBL (low-blue light), anti-reflection, anti-smudge, 100% sRGB (1920×1200 models)	1920 x 1200 2560 x 1600	14	8.46 (front height); 13.91 (rear height)	310.59	215.18	1.27 kg (laptop); 1.40 kg (2-in-1)	
9520	2021	11th Gen Intel Core Tiger Lake UP3 28w: i5-1135G7; i5-1145G7; i7-1185G7		LPDDR4x	8, 16, or 32 GB (On board)	Intel Iris X^{e} Graphics	Realtek ALC714-CG		Intel AX201	WVA	1920×1080 3840×2160	15	9.13	14.84	215.80	1.4 kg (laptop); 1.5 kg (2-in-1)	
9420	2021	11th Gen Intel Core Tiger Lake UP3 28w		LPDDR4x	8, 16, 32 GB (On board)	Intel Iris X^{e} Graphics	Realtek ALC711-CG		Intel AX210	LBL (low-blue light), anti-glare, 100% sRGB (1920×1200 models); LBL (low-blue light), anti-reflection, anti-smudge, 100% sRGB (1920×1200 models)	1920 x 1200 2560 x 1600	14	8.42 (front height); 13.91 (back front)	310.59	215.18	1.27 kg (laptop); 1.40 kg (2-in-1)	
9510	2020	Intel Core 10th Gen Comet Lake CML-U 15w Up to 10810u		LPDDR3-2133	8 or 16 GB (On board)	Intel UHD Graphics 620	Realtek ALC714-CG		Intel AX201	IPS, opt touch, 100% sRGB 400 cd/m2	1920×1080	15.6	8.23	340.2	215.8	1.4 kg	
9410	2020	Intel Core 10th Gen Comet Lake CML-U 15w Up to 10810u		LPDDR3-2133	8 or 16 GB (On board)	Intel UHD Graphics 620	Realtek ALC3254-CG		Intel AX201	IPS, opt touch, 100% sRGB 300 cd/m2	1920×1080	14.0	8.53	319.7	199.9	1.36 kg	
Ultrabook
15"
7530	2022	Intel Core 12th Gen Alder Lake 15w & 28w	Intel PCH-LP	LPDDR4x	8, 16, or 32 GB (On board)	Intel Iris X^{e} Graphics	Realtek ALC3281-CG		Intel AX211	TFT, WVA	1920×1080 3840×2160	15.6	Carbon Fiber (U15 processors): 17.37 (front height); 18.90 (rear height); Carbon Fiber (P28 processors): 18.23; 19.40; Aluminum Titan Gray: 17.50 (front height); 18.40 (rear height)	357.70	229.75	Carbon Fiber (U15 processors): 1.54 kg; Carbon Fiber (P28 processors): 1.55 kg; Aluminum Titan Gray: 1.76 kg	
7520	2021	Intel Core 11th Gen Tiger Lake U PCH 28w		LPDDR4x-3733 (derated from original -4267 after stability issues by BIOS v1.13.0)	8, 16, or 32 GB (On board)	Intel Iris X^{e} Graphics	Realtek ALC3281-CG		Intel Wi-Fi 6 AX201, 2x2, 802.11ax with Bluetooth 5.1	TFT, WVA	1920×1080; 3840×2160	15.6	17.50 (front height); 18.40 (aluminum rear height); 18.89 (Carbon Fiber rear height)	357.70	229.75	1.53 kg (Carbon Fiber); 1.76 kg (aluminium)	
14"
7430	2022	Intel Core 12th Gen Alder Lake 15w	Intel PCH-LP	DDR4 (U15 processor models) LPDDR5 (P28 processor models)	32 GB (On board)	Intel Iris X^{e} Graphics	Realtek ALC3281-CG		Intel AX211	TFT, WVA	1920×1080 (laptop and 2-in-1); 3840×2160 (laptop only)	14.0	17.27 (front height); 18.88 (rear height)	321.35	208.69	1.22 kg	
7420	2021	11th Gen Intel Core Tiger Lake U PCH 28w: i5-1135G7; i5-1145G7; i7-1165G7; i7-1185G7		LPDDR4x-3733 (derated from original -4267 after stability issues by BIOS v1.13.0)	8, 16, or 32 GB (On board)	Intel Iris X^{e} Graphics	Realtek ALC3281-CG		Intel AX201	WVA	1920×1080	14.0	Front Height: 17.27 (carbon fiber); 16.90 (alumium); 17.06 (carbon fiber 2-in-1); 16.40 (alumium 2-in-1); Rear Height: 18.88 (carbon fiber); 18.00 (alumium); 18.91 (carbon fiber 2-in-1); 18.70 (alumium 2-in-1)	321.35	208.69	1.22 kg (carbon fiber); 1.31 kg (aluminum); 1.36 kg (carbon fiber 2-in-1); 1.46 kg (aluminum 2-in-1)	
7410	2020	Intel Core 10th Gen Comet Lake Up to 10810u		DDR4-2066	32 GB (soldered)	Intel UHD Graphics 620	Realtek ALC3254		Intel Wireless-AC 9560 + Bluetooth 5.1 (non-VPro) or Intel AX201 + Bluetooth 5.1 (VPro)	WVA	1920×1080	14.0	Front Height: 18.13 (laptop); 17.07 (2-in-1); Rear Height: 19.33 (laptop); 19.38 (2-in-1)	321.35	208.69	1.33 kg (laptop); 1.46 kg (2-in-1)	
7400	2019	Intel Core 8th Gen Whiskey Lake Up to 8665u		DDR4-2400	32 GB (2 slots)	Intel UHD Graphics 620	Realtek ALC3254		Intel Dual Band Wireless-AC 9560 + Bluetooth 5.0 or AX200	IPS, opt. touch	1366×768; 1920×1080	14.0				1.35 kg (carbon fiber); 1.40 kg (aluminum)	
7490	2018	Intel Core 8th Gen Kaby Lake R Up to 8650u		DDR4-2400 (or 2133)	32 GB (2 slots)	Intel HD Graphics 620 (or UHD Graphics 620)	Realtek ALC3246-CG		Qualcomm QCA61x4A 802.11ac, Intel Dual-Band Wireless-AC 8265, Intel Tri-Band Wireless-AC 18265 WiGig, Qualcomm Snapdragon™ X7 LTE-A (DW5811e or DW5816e), or Qualcomm Snapdragon™ X7 HSPA+ (DW5811e)	IPS, opt. touch	1366×768; 1920×1080	14.0	Front Height:0.69 Rear Height:0.70	331.0	220.9	1.4 kg	
7480	2017	Intel Core 7th Gen Kaby Lake Up to 7600u		DDR4-2133	32 GB (2 slots)	Intel HD Graphics 620	Realtek ALC3246		Qualcomm QCA61x4A, or Intel Dual Band Wireless-AC 8265 + Bluetooth 4.2	WVA	1366×768; 1920×1080	14.0	Front Height: 11.58; Rear Height: 18.41 (non-touchscreen); 18.41 (touchscreen)	331.0	220.9	1.36 kg	
13"
7330	2022	Intel Core 12th Gen Alder Lake 15w	Intel PCH-LP	DDR4-3200	8, 16, 32 GB (on board)	Intel Iris X^{e} Graphics	Realtek ALC3281-CG		Intel AX211	TFT, WVA	1920×1080	13.3	16.96 (front height); 18.36 (rear height)	306.50	199.5	1.13 kg	
7320	2021	Intel Core 11th Gen Tiger Lake U PCH 28 W up to i7-1185G7 vPro		LPDDR4x-3733 (derated from original -4267 after stability issues by BIOS v1.13.0)	8, 16, 32 GB (on board)	Intel Iris X^{e} Graphics	Realtek ALC3281-CG		Intel AX201	Anti-glare WVA Anti-Reflection/ Anti-Smudge coating WVA (2-in-1 models only)	1920×1080		Front Height: 16.96 (carbon-fiber); 16.71 (aluminium); 16.40 (2-in-1); Rear Height: 18.36 (carbon-fiber); 18.00 (aluminium); 18.60 (2-in-1)	306.50	199.5	1.12 kg (carbon fiber) 1.29 kg (aluminium) 1.39 kg (2-in-1)	
7310	2020	Intel Core 10th Gen Comet Lake U PCH 25 W up to i7-10810U		DDR4-2666	32 GB (soldered)	Intel UHD Graphics	Realtek ALC3254		Intel Wireless-AC 9560, 2x2, 802.11ac with Bluetooth 5.1 (non-VPro) or Intel Wi-Fi 6 AX201, 2x2, 802.11ax with Bluetooth 5.1 (VPro)	Anti-reflection/Anti-Smudge coating WVA	1920×1080	13.3	Front Height:17.55 Rear Height:18.27	306.5	203.19	1.22 kg	
7300	2019	Intel Core 8th Gen Whiskey Lake		DDR4	32 GB (2 slots)	Intel UHD Graphics 620	Realtek ALC3254		Qualcomm QCA61x4A, or Intel Dual Band Wireless-AC 9560 + Bluetooth 5.0 or AX200	IPS	1920×1080	13.3				1.25 kg	
7390	2018	Intel Core 8th Gen Kaby Lake R		DDR4-2400 (or 2133)	16 GB (1 slot)	Intel HD Graphics 620 (or UHD Graphics 620)	Realtek ALC3246-CG		Intel Dual Band Wireless-AC 8265 + Bluetooth 4.2	IPS, opt. touch	1920×1080	13.3	17	304.8	208	1.2 kg	
7380	2017	Intel Core 7th Gen Kaby Lake		DDR4-2133	16 GB (1 slot)	Intel HD Graphics 620	Realtek ALC3246			Anti-glare WVA	1920×1080	13.3	Front: 16.7 (front, full) (for NT FHD and Touch FHD); 16.95 (front, full) (for NT Thin Bezel FHD); 11.16 (front) (for NT FHD and Touch FHD); 11.41 (front) (for NT Thin Bezel FHD); Rear: 19.95 (rear, full) (for all configurations)\; 13.95 (rear) for all configurations	304.80	207.95	1.17 kg	
12"
7290	2018	Intel Core 8th Gen Kaby Lake R		DDR4-2400 (or 2133)	16 GB (1 slot)	Intel UHD Graphics 620 (or HD Graphics 620)	Realtek ALC3246		Qualcomm QCA61x4A, Qualcomm Snapdragon X7, or Intel Dual-Band Wireless-AC 8265		1366×768		Front Height:16.53 Back Height: 16.54	304.80	207.95	1.19 kg	
7280	2017	Intel Core 7th Gen Kaby Lake		DDR4	16 GB (1 slot)	Intel HD Graphics 620	Realtek ALC3246		Qualcomm QCA61x4A, or Intel Dual Band Wireless-AC 8265 + Bluetooth 4.2		1366×768						
Midrange
15"
5531	2022	Intel Core 12th Gen	Intel H45	DDR5-4800	64 GB (2 slots)	Intel Iris X^{e} Graphics Option + NVIDIA GeForce MX550 (2 GB of VRAM) GDDR6	Realtek ALC3204 with Waves MaxxAudio Pro		Realtek RTL8822CE Intel AX211	Anti-glare TN (HD models) Anti-glare WVA (FHD models)	1366×768 1920×1080	15.6	22.67 (front height) 24.05 (rear height)	357.80	233.30	1.79 kg	
5530	2022	Intel Core 11th Gen Intel Core 12th Gen	Intel PCH-LP	DDR4-3200	64 GB (2 slots)	Intel UHD Graphics (12th gen i3 models); Intel Iris X^{e} Graphics; Option + NVIDIA GeForce MX550 (2 GB of VRAM) GDDR6	Realtek ALC3204 with Waves MaxxAudio Pro		Realtek RTL8822CE Intel AX211 Intel AX201 MediaTek MT7921	Anti-glare TN (HD models) Anti-glare WVA (FHD models)	1366×768 1920×1080	15.6	20.77 (front height) 22.15 (rear height)	357.80	233.30	1.59 kg	
5521	2021	Intel Core 11th Gen	Intel WM590	DDR4-3200	64 GB (2 slots)	Intel UHD Graphics Option + NVIDIA GeForce MX450 (2 GB of VRAM) GDDR6	Realtek ALC3204 with Waves MaxxAudio Pro		Qualcomm QCA61x4A Intel AX201 Intel AX210	Anti-glare TN (HD models) Anti-glare WVA (FHD models)	1366×768 1920×1080	15.6	22.67 (front height) 24.05 (rear height)	357.80	233.30	1.79 kg	
5520	2021	Intel Core 10th Gen Intel Core 11th Gen	Intel PCH-LP	DDR4-2667 (10th gen Intel models) DDR4-3200 (11th gen Intel models)	64 GB (2 slots)	Intel Iris X^{e} Graphics (11th gen i5/i7 models); Intel UHD Graphics (10th gen Intel & 11th gen i3 models); Option + NVIDIA GeForce MX450 (2 GB of VRAM) GDDR6	Realtek ALC3204		Intel Wi-Fi 6 AX201 Intel Wi-Fi 6 AX210 Qualcomm QCA61x4A	Anti-glare TN (HD models) Anti-glare TFT, WVA (FHD models)	1366×768 1920×1080	15.6	19.87	357.80	233.30	1.59 kg	
5511	2020	Intel Core i5-10300H i5-10400H i7-10850H		DDR4-2933	64GB (2 slots)	Intel UHD Graphics or Optional GeForce MX250					1366×768 1920×1080	15.6					
5510	2020	Intel Core i5 or i7 10th Gen 28 W		DDR4-3200	32 GB (2 slots)	Intel UHD Graphics Option + AMD Radeon RX 640 (2 GB of VRAM) GDDR5	Realtek ALC3204 with Waves MaxxAudio Pro		Qualcomm QCA61X4A Intel Wi-Fi AX201 Intel XMM 7360 Global LTE Advanced	Anti-glare WLED	1366×768 1920×1080	15.6	20.98 (front height) 22.42 (rear height)	359.10	236.25	1.82 kg	
5501	2019	Intel Core 9th Gen Coffee Lake i7-9850H	Intel CM246	DDR4-2066	32 GB (2 slots)	Intel UHD Graphics 630; Option + NVIDIA GeForce MX150	Realtek ALC3204		Intel Dual Band Wireless-AC 9560 + Bluetooth 5.0 or AX200	IPS, opt. touch	1366×768; 1920×1080	15.6					
5500	2019	Intel Core 8th Gen Whiskey Lake		DDR4-2066	32 GB (2 slots)	Intel UHD Graphics 620; Option + AMD Radeon 540x	Realtek ALC3204		Intel Dual Band Wireless-AC 9560 + Bluetooth 5.0 or AX200	IPS, opt. touch	1366×768; 1920×1080	15.6					
5591	2018	Intel Core 8th Gen Coffee Lake i7-8850H	Intel CM246	DDR4-2066	32 GB (2 slots)	Intel UHD Graphics 630; Option + NVIDIA GeForce MX130	Realtek ALC3246-CG		Intel Dual Band Wireless-AC 8265 + Bluetooth 4.2	IPS, opt. touch	1366×768; 1920×1080	15.6					
5590	2018	Intel Core 8th Gen Kaby Lake R Up to 8650u or Intel Core 7th Gen Kaby Lake Up to 7300u		DDR4-2400 (or 2133)	32 GB (2 slots)	Intel HD Graphics 620 or UHD Graphics 620; Option + NVIDIA GeForce MX130			Intel Dual Band Wireless-AC 8265 + Bluetooth 4.2	IPS, opt. touch	1366×768; 1920×1080	15.6					
5580	2017	7th gen Core i3/i5/i7		DDR4-2400 (or 2133)	32 GB (2 slots)	Intel HD Graphics 620 or UHD Graphics 620; Option + NVIDIA GeForce 940M or 930MX			Intel Dual Band Wireless-AC 8265 + Bluetooth 4.2	IPS, opt. touch	1366×768; 1920×1080	15.6					
14"
5431	2022	Intel Core 12th Gen	Intel P28	DDR5-4800	64 GB (2 slots)	Intel Iris X^{e} Graphics Option + NVIDIA GeForce MX550 (2 GB of VRAM) GDDR6	Realtek ALC3204 with Waves MaxxAudio Pro		Realtek RTL8822CE + Bluetooth 5.0 Intel AX211 + optional Bluetooth 5.2	Anti-glare TN (HD/1366×768 models) Anti-glare WVA (1920×1080)	1366×768 1920×1080	14.0	20.95 (front height) 23.60 (rear height)	321.35	212.00	1.49 kg	
5430	2022	Intel Core 11th Gen Intel Core 12th Gen	Intel PCH-LP	DDR4-3200	32 GB (2 slots)	Intel Iris X^{e} Graphics; Intel UHD Graphics (12th gen i3 models)	Realtek ALC3204 with Waves MaxxAudio Pro		Realtek RTL8822CE Intel AX211 Intel AX201 MediaTek MT7921	Anti-glare TN Anti-glare WVA	1366×768 1920×1080	14.0	19.30 (front height) 20.90 (rear height)	321.35	212.0	1.36 kg	
5420	2021	Intel Core 11th Gen i5-1145G7		DDR4	64 GB (2 slots)	Intel Iris X^{e} Graphics	Realtek ALC3204		Intel Wi-Fi 6 AX201 Intel Wi-Fi 6 AX210 Qualcomm QCA61x4A	Anti-glare WVA LBL (low blue-light) (FHD models only)	1366×768 1920×1080	14.0	19.30 (front height) 20.90 (rear height)	321.35	212.0	1.40 kg	
5410	2020	Intel Core 8th Gen Intel Core 10th Gen		DDR4-2400 (8th gen) DDR4-3200 (10th gen)	32 GB (2 slot)	Intel UHD Graphics; AMD Radeon RX 640 (2 GB of VRAM)	Realtek ALC3204 with Waves MaxxAudio Pro		Qualcomm QCA61X4A Intel Wi-Fi AX201 Intel XMM 7360 Global LTE Advanced Intel 9560 (For 8th generation Intel Core processors) Intel AX200 (For 8th generation Intel Core processors)	Anti-glare LED (HD, FHD, and FHD SLP models) Anti-glare Privacy (FHD models only)	1366×768 1920×1080	14.0	20.26 (front height) 21.18 (rear height)	323.05	216	1.52 kg	
5401	2019	Intel Core 9th Gen Coffee Lake i7-9850H	Intel CM246	DDR4	32 GB (2 slots)	Intel UHD Graphics 630; Option + NVIDIA GeForce MX150	Realtek ALC3204		Intel Dual Band Wireless-AC 9560 + Bluetooth 5.0 or AX200	Anti-glare LED	1366×768 1920×1080	14.0					
5400	2019	Intel Core 8th Gen Whiskey Lake		DDR4	32 GB (2 slots)	Intel UHD Graphics 620; Option + AMD Radeon 540x	Realtek ALC3204		Intel Dual Band Wireless-AC 9560 + Bluetooth 5.0 or AX200	Anti-glare LED	1366×768 1920×1080	14.0					
5495	2018	AMD Ryzen Raven Ridge Up to 2700u		DDR4	32 GB (2 slots)	AMD Radeon Vega 8	Realtek ALC3246		Qualcomm QCA61x4A	Anti-glare LED	1366×768; 1920×1080	14.0					
5491	2018	Intel Core i5-8300H (4× 2.3 GHz, 8 MB) i5-8400H (4× 2.5 GHz, 8 MB) i7-8850H (6× 2.6GHz, 9MB)	Intel CM246	DDR4	32 GB (2 slots)	Intel UHD Graphics 630; Option + NVIDIA GeForce MX130	Realtek ALC3246-CG			Anti-glare LED	1366×768 1920×1080	14.0					
5490	2018	Intel Core i3-7130U (2× 2.7 GHz, 3 MB) i5-7300U (2× 2.6 GHz, 3 MB) i5-8250U (4× 1.6 GHz, 6 MB) i5-8350U (4× 1.7 GHz, 6 MB) i7-8650U (4× 1.9GHz, 8MB)		DDR4	32 GB (2 slots)	Intel HD Graphics 620 or UHD Graphics 620; Option + NVIDIA GeForce MX130	Realtek ALC3246-CG			Anti-glare LED	1366×768 1920×1080	14.0					
5480	2017	7th gen Core i3/i5/i7		DDR4	32 GB (2 slots)	Intel HD Graphics 620 or UHD Graphics 620; Option + NVIDIA GeForce 940M or 930MX	Realtek ALC3246-CG		Intel Dual Band Wireless-AC 8265 + Bluetooth 4.2 or Bluetooth 4.1	Anti-glare LED	1366×768 1920×1080	14.0					Windows 10
13"
5330	2022	Intel Core 11th Gen Intel Core 12th Gen	Intel PCH-LP	DDR4-3200	32 GB (dual-channel onboard memory)	Intel UHD Graphics (12th gen i3); Intel Iris X^{e} Graphics (11th/12th gen Intel Core)	Realtek ALC3204 with Waves MaxxAudio Pro		Realtek RTL8822CE Intel AX211 MediaTek MT7921	Anti-glare WVA (DXC) Anti-reflection/Antismudge WVA (2-in-1 models only)	1920×1080	13.3	16.92 (front height) 18.43 (rear height)	305.70	207.50	1.20 kg (laptop) 1.32 kg (2-in-1)	
5320	2021	Intel Core 11th Gen 17.50 W		DDR4-3200	32 GB (Onboard memory)	Intel UHD 630 Graphics	Realtek ALC3254		Intel Wi-Fi 6 AX201 Intel AX210 Qualcomm QCA61x4A	Anti-glare WVA, SLP	1920×1080	13.3	16.96 (front height)	305.70	207.50	1.18 kg (laptop) 1.32 kg (2-in-1)	
5310 2-in-1	2020	Intel Core 10th Gen 15 W		DDR4-2667	32 GB (2 slots)	Intel UHD Graphics	Realtek ALC3254		Intel AX201 Qualcomm QCA61 x 4A (DW1820)	Anti-glare WVA	1920×1080	13.27	17.53 (front height) 19.71 (rear height)	305.70	207.50	1.32 kg	
5310	2020	Intel Core 10th Gen 15 W		DDR4-2667	32 GB (2 slots)	Intel UHD Graphics	Realtek ALC3254		Intel AX201 Qualcomm QCA61x4A (DW1820)	Anti-glare TN (HD models) Anti-glare WVA (FHD models)	1366×768 1920×1080	13.3	17.53 (front height) 19.72 (rear height)	305.70	207.50	1.24 kg	
5300	2019	Intel Core i3-8145U Intel Core i5-8265U Intel Core i5-8365U Intel Core i7-8665U		DDR4-2666	32 GB (2 slots)	Intel UHD Graphics 620	Realtek ALC3254 with Waves MaxxAudio Pro		Intel Dual Band Wireless-AC 9560 + Bluetooth 5.0 or AX200	Anti-glare WLED	1920×1080	13.3	Front Height:16.9 Rear Height:19.3	305.7	207.5	1.24 kg	
12"
5290 2-in-1	2018	Intel Core i3, i5 and i7		LPDDR3	16 GB (on-board memory)	Intel HD Graphics 620 (7th gen Intel Core); Intel UHD Graphics 620 (8th gen Intel Core)	Realtek ALC3253 Controller		Qualcomm® QCA61x4A 802.11ac Dual Band (2x2) Wireless Adapter+ Bluetooth 4.1 Qualcomm® QCA6174A Extended Range 802.11ac MU-MIMO Dual Band (2x2) Wi-Fi + Bluetooth 4.1 Intel® Dual-Band Wireless-AC 8265 Wi-Fi + BT 4.217 Wireless Card (2x2). Bluetooth Optional	Anti-reflective, and Anti-smudge WVA with Corning Gorilla Glass 4	1920×1080	12.3	9.76 - 10.65 (tablet only) 14.9 - 15.9 (tablet + keyboard only)	292	208.8 (tablet only) 216.4 (tablet w/ travel keyboard)		
5290	2018	Intel Core i3, i5 and i7		DDR4	32 GB (2 slots)	Intel HD Graphics 620 (or UHD 620)	Realtek ALC3254			Anti-glare LED	1366×768	12.5	21.40	305.10	211.30	1.36 kg	
5280	2017	Intel Core i3, i5 and i7		DDR4	32 GB (2 slots)	Intel HD Graphics 620	Realtek AL3253			Anti-glare LED Anti fingerprint and Anti reflective LED (FHD models only)	1366×768 1920×1080	12.5	21.40	305.10	211.30	1.36 kg	
Entry-Level
15"
3500	2019	Intel Core 8th Gen Whiskey Lake		DDR4	32 GB (2 slots)	Intel UHD Graphics 620	Realtek ALC3204		Qualcomm QCA9377 802.11ac Single Band (1x1) Wireless Adapter + Bluetooth 4.1 Qualcomm QCA61x4A 802.11ac Dual Band (2x2) Wireless Adapter + Bluetooth 4.2 Intel Dual-Band Wireless-AC 9560 Wi-Fi + Bluetooth 5.0 Wireless Card (2x2). Bluetooth (Optional) Intel Wi-Fi 6 AX200 2x2 .11ax 160 MHz + Bluetooth 5.0 Dell DW5820e Intel 7360 LTE-A; LTE Cat 9	Anti-glare LED	1366×768 1920×1080	15.6	18.0	378.66	255.35	1.98 kg	
3590	2018	Intel Core 8th Gen Kaby Lake R		DDR4	32 GB (2 slots)	Intel UHD Graphics 620	Realtek ALC3246		Qualcomm QCA9377 802.11ac MU-MIMO Dual Band (1x1) Wi-Fi + Bluetooth 4.1 LE M.2 Wireless Card Qualcomm QCA61x4A 802.11ac MU-MIMO Dual Band (2x2) Wi-Fi + Bluetooth 4.1 LE M.2 Wireless Card Intel® Dual Band Wireless-AC 8265 802.11AC 2x2 Wi-Fi + BT 4.2 LE M.2 Wireless Card	Anti-glare LED	1366×768 1920×1080	15.6	22.7	380.0	258.0	2.02 kg	
3580	2017	Intel Core 7th Gen Kaby Lake		DDR4	16 GB (2 slots)	Intel HD Graphics 620	Realtek ALC3246		Qualcomm QCA9377 802.11ac Dual Band (1x1) Wireless Adapter+ Bluetooth 4.1 Qualcomm QCA61x4A 802.11ac Dual Band (2x2) Wireless Adapter+ Bluetooth 4.1 Intel Dual-Band Wireless-AC 8265 Wi-Fi + BT 4.2 (limited to BT 4.1 by Windows OS) Wireless Card (2x2)	Anti-glare LED	1366×768 1920×1080	15.6	23.3 (front height)	379.0	255.0	1.95 kg	
14"
3400	2018	Intel Core 8th Gen Whiskey Lake		DDR4	64 GB (2 slots)	Intel UHD Graphics 620	Realtek ALC3204		Qualcomm QCA9377 + Bluetooth 4.1, Qualcomm QCA61x4A + Bluetooth 4.2, Intel Dual-Band Wireless-AC 9560 + (optional) Bluetooth 5.0, Intel WiFi 6 AX200 + Bluetooth 5.0, or Dell DW5820e Intel 7360 LTE-A	Anti-glare LED	1366×768 1920×1080	14.0	Front Height:18.65 Rear Height:19.2	330.3	9.37	1.75 kg	
3490	2017	Intel Core 8th Gen Kaby Lake R		DDR4	32 GB (2 slots)	Intel UHD Graphics 620	Realtek ALC3246		Qualcomm QCA9377 + Bluetooth 4.1 LE, Qualcomm QCA61x4A + Bluetooth 4.1 LE,	Anti-glare LED	1366×768 1920×1080	14.0	2.10	339.0	241.9	1.72 kg	
3480	2016	Intel Core 7th Gen Kaby Lake		DDR4	16 GB (2 slots)	Intel HD Graphics 620	Realtek ALC3246		Qualcomm QCA9377 + Bluetooth 4.1	Anti-glare LED	1366×768 1920×1080	14.0	Front Height:23.33 Rear Height:23.33	337.4	244.0	1.76 kg	
13"
3330 (2022 model)	2022	Intel Core 11th Gen Intel Core 12th Gen		LPDDR4x	16 GB (Onboard memory)	Intel UHD Graphics (i3 models) Intel Iris Xe Graphics (i5 models)	Realtek ALC3204		Realtek RTL8822CE + Bluetooth 5.0 Intel AX201 + Bluetooth 5.2	Anti-glare WVA	1920×1080	13.30"	Clamshell models: 15.68 (front height); 17.22 (rear height); 2-in-1 models: 16.42 (front height); 17.75 (rear height)	305.98	209.78	1.28 kg (clamshell models); 1.37 kg (2-in-1 models)	
3320	2021	Intel Celeron-4205U Intel Pentium-5405U Intel Core i3-8145U Intel Core i5-8265U	Whiskey Lake	DDR4	16 GB (1 SODIMM slot)	Intel UHD Grapics 610 (Pentium models) Intel UHD Graphics 620 (i3/i5 models)	Realtek ALC3246		Intel 9560	Anti-glare IPS	1366×768	13.30"	22.30	329.60	230.45	1.59 kg	
3310 2-in-1	2019	8th Gen Intel Core: i3-8145U; i5-8365U; Intel Pentium 5405U	Premium U/Mainstream U	DDR4	16 GB (1 SODIMM slot)	Intel UHD Graphics 610 (Pentium models); Intel UHD Graphics 620 (i3/i5 models)	Realtek ALC3246		Intel 9560	Anti-glare IPS	1920×1080	13.30"	19.60	320.60	225.50	1.55 kg	
3310	2019	8th Gen Intel Core: i3-8145U; i5-8265UIntel Celeron-4205U; Intel Pentium-5405U	Whiskey Lake	DDR4	16 GB (1 SODIMM slot)	Intel UHD Grapics 610 (Celeron/Pentium models); Intel UHD Graphics 620 (i3/i5 models)	Realtek ALC3246		Intel 9560	Anti-glare IPS	1366×768	13.30"	22.30	329.60	230.45	1.59 kg	
3301	2018	Intel Core i3-8145U Intel Core i5-8265U Intel Core i5-8365U Intel Core i7-8565U		DDR4	4 GB 8 GB 16 GB (on-board memory)	Intel UHD Graphics 620	Realtek ALC3204 with Waves MaxxAudio Pro		Intel Dual Band Wireless AC 9560 Wi-Fi (802.11ac) 2x2 + Bluetooth 5.0 (Bluetooth Optional) Intel Dual Band Wireless AC 9462 Wi-Fi (802.11ac) 1x1 + Bluetooth 5.0	Anti-glare LED	1366×768 1920×1080	13.30"	16.80 (PC) 14.90 (AI)	307.6 (PC & AI models)	204.50 (PC & AI models)	1.18 kg (PC) 1.17 kg (AI)	
3300	2017	Intel Celeron 3865U Intel Pentium 4415U Intel Core i3-7020U Intel Core i5-8250U		DDR4	8 GB, 16 GB (1 SODIMM slot)	Intel UHD Graphics 620	Realtek ALC3246		Intel Dual Band Wireless-AC 8265 802.11AC 2 x 2 Wi-Fi + BT 4.2 LE M.2 Wireless Card Qualcomm® QCA61x4A 802.11ac MU-MIMO Dual Band (2 x 2) Wi-Fi + Bluetooth 4.2 LE M.2 Wireless Card	Anti-glare WLED (non-touch) True-life WLED (touch)	1366×768 (non-touch) 1920×1080 (touch)	13.3	22.3	329.6	230.45	1.59 kg	
3390 (2-in-1)	2017	Intel Pentium 4415U Intel Core i3-6006 Intel Core i3 7th Gen Intel Core i5 8th Gen		DDR4-2133 (6th/7th gen Intel models) DDR4-2400 (8th gen Intel models)	16 GB (2 slots)	Intel UHD Graphics 620	Realtek ALC3253 with Waves MaxxAudio pro		Qualcomm QCA61x4A 802.11ac	Touch FHD AG	1920×1080	13.30"	19.5 (front height) 20.4 (back height)	324	224	1.57 kg	
3380	2016	Intel Core i3-6006U i5-7200U		DDR4	8 GB (1 SODIMM slot)	Intel HD Graphics 520; Intel HD Graphics 620	Realtek ALC3246		Intel Dual Band Wireless-AC 7265 802.11AC 2x2 Wi-Fi + BT 4.2 LE Solder Down Card	Anti-glare LED Touch with Corning Gorilla Glass NBT	1366×768	13.3"		332.90		1.648 kg	
11.6"
3120	2021	Intel Celeron N5100 Intel Pentium Silver N6000		DDR4 (Celeron models) LPDDR4x (Pentium models)	4 GB, 8 GB, 16 GB (onboard memory)	Intel UHD Graphics	Realtek ALC3246-HDA Codec		Intel Wi-Fi 5 9560 (160 MHz) (Celeron models) Intel Wi-Fi 6 AX201 (Pentium models)	Anti-glare TN (laptop models) Glossy finish IPS (touchscreenaw/ nti-fingerprint, and 60 convertible) (2-in-1 models)	1366×768	11.6"	Laptop: 20.90 (front); 20.90 (rear); 2-in-1: 21.40 (front and rear)	300.88	204.88	1.35 kg (laptop) 1.42 kg (2-in-1)	
3190 2-in-1	2019	Intel Celeron N4100/N4120 Intel Pentium N5000/N5030		DDR4	4 GB 8 GB (on-board memory)	Intel HD Graphics 600 (Celeron models); Intel HD Graphics 605 (Pentium models)	Realtek ALC3246		Intel Dual Band Wireless-AC 8265 802.11AC 2x2 Wi-Fi + BT 4.2 LE Solder Down Card		1366×768	11.6"	21.25	303.8	207.9	1.47 kg	
3190	2019	Intel Celeron Processor N4100 Intel Pentium Processor N5000		DDR4	4 GB and 8 GB (on-board memory)	Intel HD Graphics 600 (Celeron models); Intel HD Graphics 605 (Pentium models)	Realtek ALC3246		Intel Dual Band Wireless-AC 8265 802.11AC 2x2 Wi-Fi + BT 4.2 LE Solder Down Card		1366×768	11.6"	20.75	303.3	206	1.27 kg	
3189	2018	Intel Celeron N3350 Intel Pentium N4200		LPDDR3	2 GB and 4 GB and 8 GB (8 GB RAM on P26T001 only) (on-board memory)	Intel HD Graphics 500 (Celeron models); Intel HD Graphics 505 (Pentium models)	Realtek ALC3234		Intel Dual Band Wireless-AC 7265 802.11AC 2x2 Wi-Fi + BT 4.2 LE Solder Down Card		1366×768	11.6"	20.75	303.80	207.9	1.4749 kg	
3180	2017	Intel Celeron N3450/N3350 Intel Pentium N4200		DDR3L	2 GB and 4 GB (on-board memory)	Intel HD Graphics 500 (Celeron models); Intel HD Graphics 505 (Pentium models)	Realtek ALC3234		Intel Dual Band Wireless-AC 7265 802.11AC 2x2 Wi-Fi + BT 4.2 LE Solder Down Card		1366×768	11.6"	20.75	303.30	206.00	1.26 kg	
Gray colored cards - switchable graphics (AMD Dynamic Switchable Graphics or Nvidia Optimus); Red colored cards - non-switchable discrete graphics (may be changed for purchase time only)

=== Z-Family (2009) ===
Model	Release	Inspiron cousin	CPU	Chipset	Memory		Graphics				Audio codec	Network card	Screen		Dimensions (mm)			Weight	Operating System	Notes
Model	Release	Inspiron cousin	CPU	Chipset	Type	Maximum	Type	Clock rate	Controller	Allocated memory	Audio codec	Network card	Type	Maximum resolution	Height	Width	Depth	Weight	Operating System	Notes
Z600	2009		Intel Core 2 Duo SU9400 Intel Core 2 Duo SU9600	Intel GS45	DDR3-1066	2 GB, 4 GB (Onboard memory)	Integrated (chipset)	475 MHz	Intel GMA 4500MHD	up to 384 MB	IDT 92HD81B		WLED	1600×900	14.55-20.1	396.34	272.25	2 kg		The "Dell Latitude Z600" is also known as the "Dell Latitude Z".

=== E-Family (2007-2017) ===
Model	Release	CPU	Chipset	Memory		Graphics	Audio codec	Network card	Screen			Dimensions (mm)			Weight	Operating System
Model	Release	CPU	Chipset	Type	Maximum	Graphics	Audio codec	Network card	Type	Resolution	"	Height	Width	Depth	Weight	Operating System
Ultrabook
14"
E7470	2016	6th Gen Intel Core up to i7-6650U (2×2.2 GHz 4MB)		DDR4-2133	32 GB (2 slots)	Intel HD 520 or HD 540	Intel Skylake-U/Y PCH - Realtek	Intel Dual Band Wireless-AC 8260 + Bluetooth 4.2	Anti-glare LED (opt. + 2 finger multi-touch)	1366×768; 1600×900; 1920×1080; 2560×1440	14.0	19.4	334.9	232	1.36 kg	
E7450	2015	5th Gen Intel Core up to i7-5600U (2×2.6 GHz 4MB)		DDR3L-1600	16 GB (2 slots)	Intel HD Graphics 5500; Option + NVIDIA GeForce 840M (2 GB GDDR3)	Realtek ALC3235	Intel Wireless-AC 7265 (802.11ac + BT 4.0LE 2x2); Dell Wireless: 1560 (802.11ac + BT 4.0LE 2x2); or 1707 (802.11n + BT 4.0LE 1x1) Option + Dell Wireless: DW5808E (Qualcomm Gobi 4G LTE)	Anti-glare LCD (Option + Multi-Touch)	1366×768 1920×1080	14.0	337.8	231.1	20.3	3.43 lb (3-cell non-touch)	
E6430u	2013	Intel Core 3rd Gen Ivy Bridge up to i7-3667U (2x4 3.2 GHz 4 MB)		DDR3L-1600	8 GB (2 slots)	Intel HD Graphics 4000		Intel Centrino: Advanced-N 6205 (Note: Optionally WiMax) or Ultimate-N 6300; or Dell Wireless: 1504 (802.11g/n 1x1) or 1540 (802.11n 2x2)	Anti-glare LED	1366×768 1600×900	14.0	338.2	229.7	20.9	1.69 kg (3-cell)	
13"
7370	2016	Intel Core 6th Gen Skylake		DDR4-2133	16 GB (2 slots)	Intel HD Graphics 620	Realtek ALC3246			1920×1080	13.3	9.86 (front) 14.35 (back)	304.8	210.5	1.12 kg	
12"
E7270	2016	Intel Core 6th Gen Skylake		DDR4-2133	16 GB (2 slots)	Intel HD Graphics 520		Intel Wireless-AC 8260 (802.11ac 2x2) Dell Wireless: 1820 (802.11ac 2x2)		1366×768; 1920×1080	12.5					
E7250	2015	Intel Core 5th Gen Broadwell		DDR3L-1600	16 GB (2 slots)	Intel HD Graphics 5500		Intel Wireless-AC 7265 (802.11ac 2x2) Dell Wireless: 1707 (802.11n 1x1)		1366×768; 1920×1080	12.5					
E7240	2013	Intel Core 4th Gen Haswell		DDR3L-1600	16 GB (2 slots)	Intel HD Graphics 4400	Intel Lynx Point HD	Intel Wireless-N 7260 (802.11ac 2x2) Dell Wireless: 1601 (802.11.n 1x1) or 1506 (802.11n 1x1)		1366×768; 1920×1080	12.5					
High-End
15"
E6540	2013	Intel Core 4th Gen Haswell Up to 4810MQ	Intel QM87	DDR3L-1600	16 GB (2 slots)	Intel HD Graphics 4600; Option + AMD Radeon 8790M (2 GB GDDR5)	Realtek ALC3226	Intel Centrino: Advanced-N 6235 + Bluetooth 4.0 or Ultimate-N 6300 or Dell Wireless 1506 (802.11g/n 1x1)	Anti-glare LED	1366×768; 1920×1080	15.6	33.4	379	250.5	5.64 lb	
E6530	2012	Intel Core i3, i5 and i7 up to i7-37x0QM	Intel QM77 (Note: Optional Intel Rapid Start Technology, Intel Smart Connect Technology (SSD required))	DDR3–1600	16 GB (2 slots)	Intel HD Graphics 3000 (i3-2xxx) or HD Graphics 4000 (i3/i5/i7 3xxxM); Option + NVIDIA NVS 5200M (1 GB GDDR5)	IDT 92HDxxx	Intel Centrino: Advanced-N 6205 or Ultimate-N 6300; or Dell Wireless: 1504 (802.11g/n 1x1) or 1540 (802.11n 2x2)	Anti-glare LED	1366×768; 1600×900; 1920×1080	15.6	28.3-34.2	384	258	5.4 lb (4-cell, SSD)	
E6520	2011	Up to Intel Core i7-2860QM (4× 2.5 GHz, 8MB L3)	Intel QM67	DDR3–1600	16 GB (Note: officially supported 8 GB) (2 slots)	Intel HD Graphics 3000; Option + NVIDIA NVS 4200M (512 MB)	IDT 92HDxxx	Intel Centrino: Advanced-N 6205 (802.11n 2x2) or Ultimate-N 6300 (802.11n 3x3); Dell Wireless: 1501 (802.11b/g/n 1x1); or 1530 (802.11a/g/n 2x2)	Anti-glare LED (opt. + 2 finger multi-touch)	1366×768; 1600×900; 1920×1080	15.6	28.3-34.2	384	258	5.52 lb (4-cell)	
E6510	2010	Intel Core Clarksfield Up to 820QM	Intel QM57	DDR3–1333	8/16 GB (Note: 16 GB with Quad-Core i7, only models with dedicated graphics) (2 slots)	Intel HD Graphics; Option + NVIDIA NVS 3100M (512 MB DDR3)	IDT 92HDxxx	Intel Centrino: Advanced-N 6200 or 6250 (802.11n 2x2) or Ultimate-N 6300 (802.11n 3x3); Dell Wireless: 1501 (802.11b/g/n 1x1); or 1520 (802.11a/g/n 2x2)	LED backlit TN	1366×768; 1600×900; 1920×1080	15.6	27.4-33.3	358	257	5.53 lb (6-cell)	
E6500	2009	Intel Core 2 Duo, up to T9800 (2× 2.93 GHz 6MB L2)	Intel GM45	DDR2-800	8 GB (2 slots)	Intel GMA 4500MHD	IDT 92HDxxx	Dell Wireless: 1397 or 1510; Intel WiFi Link 5100 or 5300	CCFL backlit or LED backlit	1280×800 1440×900 1920×1200	15.4	27.4-33.3	358	257	5.15 lb (4-cell)	
E6500	2009	Intel Core 2 Duo, up to T9800 (2× 2.93 GHz 6MB L2)	Intel PM45	DDR2-800	8 GB (2 slots)	or NVIDIA Quadro NVS 160M (256 MB DDR2)	IDT 92HDxxx	Dell Wireless: 1397 or 1510; Intel WiFi Link 5100 or 5300	CCFL backlit or LED backlit	1280×800 1440×900 1920×1200	15.4	27.4-33.3	358	257	5.15 lb (4-cell)	
14"
E6440	2013	Intel Core 4th Gen Haswell Up to 4610M	Intel QM87 (Note: And optional Intel Smart Connect Technology (SSD required))	DDR3L	16 GB (2 slots)	Intel HD 4600; Option + AMD Radeon 8690M (2 GB GDDR5)	Intel Lynx Point HD	Intel Centrino: Advanced-N 6235 + Bluetooth 4.0 or Ultimate-N 6300 or Dell Wireless 1506 (802.11g/n 1x1)	Anti-glare LED	1366×768; 1600×900 1920×1080 (later eDP models)	14.0	31.8	338	232.6	4.68 lb	
E6430	2012	Intel Core i3, i5 and i7 up to i7-37x0QM	Intel QM77	DDR3–1333	16 GB (2 slots)	Intel HD Graphics 3000 (Core i3-2xxx) or HD Graphics 4000 (Core i3/i5/i7 3xxxM); Option + NVIDIA NVS 5200M	IDT 92HD93	Intel Centrino: Advanced-N 6205 or 6250 or Ultimate-N 6300; or Dell Wireless: 1504 (802.11b/g/n 1x1), or 1540 (802.11a/g/n 2x2)	Anti-glare LED	1366×768, 1600×900	14.0					
E6420	2011	Up to Intel Core i7-2860QM (4× 2.5 GHz, 8MB L3)	Intel QM67	DDR3–1333	16 GB (2 slots)	Intel HD Graphics 3000; Option + NVIDIA NVS 4200M (512 MB)	IDT 92HDxxx	Intel Centrino: Advanced-N 6205 (802.11n 2x2) or Ultimate-N 6300 (802.11n 3x3); Dell Wireless: 1501 (802.11b/g/n 1x1); or 1530 (802.11a/g/n 2x2)	Anti-glare LED (opt. + 2 finger multi-touch)	1366×768, 1600×900	14.0	27–32.4	352	241	4.56 lb (4-cell)	
E6410	2010	Up to Intel Core i7-840QM (4× 3.2 GHz, 8MB L3) max. factory-installed is i7-640M (2× 2.8 GHz, 4MB L3)	Intel QM57	DDR3–1333	8/16 GB (2 slots)	Intel HD; Option + NVIDIA NVS 3100M (512 MB DDR3)	IDT 92HDxxx	Intel Centrino: Advanced-N 6200 or 6250 (802.11n 2x2) or Ultimate-N 6300 (802.11n 3x3); Dell Wireless: 1501 (802.11b/g/n 1x1); or 1520 (802.11a/g/n 2x2)	LED backlit	1280×800; 1440×900	14.1	27.4-33.3	358	257	4.2 lb (6-cell)	
E6400	2008	Intel Core 2 Duo, up to T9800 (2× 2.93 GHz 6MB L2)	Intel GM45	DDR2-800	8 GB (2 slots)	Intel GMA 4500MHD	IDT 92HDxxx	Dell Wireless: 1397 or 1510; Intel WiFi Link 5100 or 5300	LED backlit	1280×800; 1440×900	14.1	25.4-31	335	238.3	4.3 lb (4-cell)	
E6400	2008	Intel Core 2 Duo, up to T9800 (2× 2.93 GHz 6MB L2)	Intel PM45	DDR2-800	8 GB (2 slots)	or NVIDIA Quadro NVS 160M (512 MB DDR2)	IDT 92HDxxx	Dell Wireless: 1397 or 1510; Intel WiFi Link 5100 or 5300	LED backlit	1280×800; 1440×900	14.1	25.4-31	335	238.3	4.3 lb (4-cell)	
13"
E6330	2012	Intel Core i3, i5 or i7 up to i7-35x0M	Intel QM77	DDR3-1600	16 GB (2 slots)	Intel HD 3000 or HD 4000		Intel Centrino: Advanced-N 6205 or 6250 or Ultimate-N 6300; or Dell Wireless: 1504 (802.11b/g/n 1x1), or 1540 (802.11a/g/n 2x2)	LED backlit	1366×768	13.3					
E6320	2011	Intel Core 2nd Gen Sandy Bridge Up to i7-26x0M	Intel QM67	DDR3–1333	16 GB (2 slots)	Intel HD Graphics 3000		Intel Centrino: Advanced-N 6205 or Ultimate-N 6300; or Dell Wireless: 1501 (802.11b/g/n 1x1), or 1530 (802.11a/g/n 2x2)	Anti-glare LED	1366×768	13.3	25.4-30.1	335	223.3	3.64 lb (3-cell)	
E4310	2010	Intel Core Arrandale Up to i5-540m	Intel QS57	DDR3–1333	8 GB (2 slots)	Intel HD		Dell Wireless: 1501 (802.11n) Intel® WiFi Link 6200 (802.11n 2x2) 6300 (802.11n 3x3) 6250 (802.11n 2x2)	LED backlit	1366×768	13.3					
E4300	2008	Intel Core 2 Duo up to SP9600	Intel GS45	DDR3-1066	8 GB (2 slots)	Intel GMA 4500MHD		Dell Wireless: 1397 (802.11g), or 1510 (802.11a/g/n 2x2), Intel WiFi Link: 5100 (802.11a/g/n 1x2), or 5300 (802.11a/g/n 3x3)	LED backlit	1280×800	13.3	25.4-29	310	217.4	1.5 kg (3-cell)	
12"
E6230	2012	Intel Core i3, i5 and i7	Intel QM77	DDR3-1600	16 GB (2 slots)	Intel HD Graphics 3000 or HD 4000			Anti-glare LED	1366×768	12.5					
E6220	2011	Intel core 2nd Gen Sandy Bridge Up to i7-26x0M	Intel QM67	DDR3–1333	16 GB (2 slots)	Intel HD Graphics 3000		Intel Centrino: Advanced-N 6205 or Ultimate-N 6300, or Dell Wireless: 1501 (802.11b/g/n 1x1), or 1530 (802.11a/g/n 2x2)	Anti-glare LED	1366×768	12.5	24.7	309	226	3.17 lb (3-cell)	
E4200	2008	Intel Core 2 Duo up to SP9600	Intel GS45	DDR3-1066	5 GB (1 slot, 1 GB on board)	Intel GMA 4500MHD		Dell Wireless: 1397 (802.11g), or 1510 (802.11a/g/n 2x2), Intel WiFi Link: 5100 (802.11a/g/n 1x2), or 5300 (802.11a/g/n 3x3)	LED backlit	1280×800	12.5	19.2	209.6	204	1 kg (4-cell)	
Midrange
15"
E5570	2016	Intel Core 6th Gen Skylake ULV or 45w Up to 6600u or 6820HQ		DDR4-2133	32 GB (2 slots)	Intel HD Graphics530; Option + AMD Radeon R7 M370		Intel Wireless-AC 8260 (802.11ac 2x2) Dell Wireless: 1820 (802.11ac 2x2)	Anti-glare LED (opt multi-touch)	1366×768; 1920×1080	15.6					
E5550	2015	Intel Core 5th Gen Broadwell ULV Up to 5600u		DDR3L-1600	16 GB (2 slots)	Intel HD 5500; Option + NVIDIA GeForce 840M		Intel Wireless-AC 7265 (802.11ac 2x2) Dell Wireless: 1707 (802.11n 1x1)	Anti-glare LED	1366×768; 1920×1080	15.6					
E5540	2013	Intel Core 4th Gen Haswell ULV Up to 4600u		DDR3L-1600	16 GB (2 slots)	Intel HD 4400; Option + NVIDIA GeForce 720M		Intel Centrino: Advanced-N 7260 + Bluetooth 4.0 or Ultimate-N 6300 or Dell Wireless 1601 (802.11g/n 2x2) 1506 (802.11g/n 1x1)	Anti-glare LED (opt. + 2 finger multi-touch)	1366×768; 1920×1080	15.6					
E5530	2012	Intel Core i3, i5 and i7 up to i7-37x0QM	Intel QM77	DDR3-1600	16 GB (2 slots)	Intel HD 3000 or HD 4000		Intel Centrino: Advanced-N 6205 or 6250 or Ultimate-N 6300; or Dell Wireless: 1504 (802.11b/g/n 1x1), or 1540 (802.11a/g/n 2x2)	Anti-glare LED	1366×768, 1600×900	15.6					
E5520	2011	Intel Core 2nd Gen Sandy Bridge	Intel QM67	DDR3-1333	8 GB (2 slots)	Intel HD 3000		Intel Centrino: Advanced-N 6205 (802.11n 2x2) or Ultimate-N 6300 (802.11n 3x3); Dell Wireless: 1501 (802.11b/g/n 1x1); or 1530 (802.11a/g/n 2x2)	Anti-glare LED	1366×768, 1600×900	15.6					
E5510	2010	Intel Core Arrandale Up to 620m	Intel HM55	DDR3-1333	8 GB (2 slots)	Intel HD		Intel Centrino: Advanced-N 6200 or 6250 (802.11n 2x2) or Ultimate-N 6300 (802.11n 3x3); Dell Wireless: 1501 (802.11b/g/n 1x1); or 1520 (802.11a/g/n 2x2)	Anti-glare LED	1366×768, 1600×900	15.6	33.8	371	250	5.72 lb (6-cell)	
14"
E5470	2016	Intel Core 6th Gen Skylake ULV or 45w Up to 6600u or 6820HQ		DDR4-2133	32 GB (2 slots)	Intel HD Graphics 530; Option + AMD Radeon R7 M370		Intel Wireless-AC 8260 (802.11ac + BT 4.1 2x2) or 18620 (WiGig + 802.11ac + BT 4.1); Dell Wireless: 1820 (802.11ac + BT 4.1 2x2)) Option + Dell Wireless: DW5811 (Qualcomm Snapdragon X7 LTE)	Anti-glare WLED; Multi-Touch LCD	1366×768; 1920×1080; 2560×1440	14.0	23.2	334.9	231.1	3.88 lb (4-cell non-touch)	
E5450	2015	Intel Core 5th Gen Broadwell ULV Up to 5600u		DDR3L-1600	16 GB (2 slots)	Intel HD 5500		Intel Wireless-AC 7265 (802.11ac 2x2) Dell Wireless: 1707 (802.11n 1x1)	Anti-glare LED	1366×768 1920×1080	14.0					
E5440	2013	Intel Core 4th Gen Haswell Up to 4600u		DDR3L-1600	16 GB (2 slots)	Intel HD 4400; Option + NVIDIA GeForce 720M		Intel Centrino: Advanced-N 7260 + Bluetooth 4.0 or Ultimate-N 6300 or Dell Wireless 1601 (802.11g/n 2x2) 1506 (802.11g/n 1x1)	Anti-glare LED	1366×768, 1600×900	14.0					
E5430	2012	Intel Core i3, i5 and i7 up to i7-37x0QM	Intel QM77	DDR3-1600	16 GB (2 slots)	Intel HD 3000 or HD 4000		Intel Centrino: Advanced-N 6205 or 6250 or Ultimate-N 6300; or Dell Wireless: 1504 (802.11b/g/n 1x1), or 1540 (802.11a/g/n 2x2)	Anti-glare LED	1366×768, 1600×900	14.0					
E5420	2011	Intel Core 2nd Gen Sandy Bridge	Intel QM67	DDR3-1333	8 GB (2 slots)	Intel HD Graphics 3000		Intel Centrino: Advanced-N 6205 (802.11n 2x2) or Ultimate-N 6300 (802.11n 3x3); Dell Wireless: 1501 (802.11b/g/n 1x1); or 1530 (802.11a/g/n 2x2)	Anti-glare LED	1366×768, 1600×900	14.0					
E5410	2010	Intel Core Arrandale Up to 620m	Intel HM55	DDR3-1333	8 GB (2 slots)	Intel HD Graphics		Intel Centrino: Advanced-N 6200 or 6250 (802.11n 2x2) or Ultimate-N 6300 (802.11n 3x3); Dell Wireless: 1501 (802.11b/g/n 1x1); or 1520 (802.11a/g/n 2x2)	Anti-glare LED	1280×800 1440×900	14.0					
12"																
E5270	2016	Intel Core 6th Gen Skylake ULV		DDR4-2133	(2 slots)	Intel HD Graphics 520		Intel Wireless-AC 8260 (802.11ac 2x2) Dell Wireless: 1820 (802.11ac 2x2)	Anti-glare LED	1366×768 1920×1080	12.5					
E5250	2015	Intel Core 5th Gen Broadwell ULV Up to 5600u		DDR3-1600	(2 slots)	Intel HD Graphics 5500		Intel Wireless-AC 7265 (802.11ac 2x2) Dell Wireless: 1707 (802.11n 1x1)	Anti-glare LED	1366×768 1920×1080	12.5					
10"
5179	2015	6th Gen Intel Core m		LPDDR3	4 GB or 8 GB (on board)	Intel HD Graphics 515				1920×1080	10.8	6.96	279.76		0.76 kg	
5175	2015	6th Gen Intel Core m		LPDDR3	4 GB or 8 GB (on board)	Intel HD Graphics 515				1920×1080	10.8	6.96	279.78		0.71 kg	
Entry-Level
15"
3570	2015	Intel Core 6th Gen Skylake ULV		DDR3L-1600	16 GB (2 slots)	Intel HD 520; Option + NVIDIA GeForce 920M		Intel Wireless-AC 3165 (802.11ac 1x1) or 8260 (802.11ac 2x2) or Wireless-N 7265 (802.11n) Dell Wireless 1802 (802.11ac 2x2)	Anti-glare LED	1366×768 1920×1080	15.6	23.25	380	260	2.06 kg (4 cell)	
3560	2014	Intel Core 5th Gen Broadwell ULV Up to 5500u		DDR3L-1600	16 GB (2 slots)	Intel HD 5500; Option + NVIDIA GeForce 920M		Intel Wireless-AC 3165 (802.11ac 1x1) or 8260 (802.11ac 2x2) or Wireless-N 7265 (802.11n) Dell Wireless 1802 (802.11ac 2x2)	Anti-glare LED	1366×768 1920×1080	15.6	23.25	380	260	2.06 kg (4 cell)	
3550	2014	Intel Core 5th Gen Broadwell ULV Up to 5500u		DDR3L-1600	16 GB (2 slots)	Intel HD 4400; Option + NVIDIA GeForce 830M	Realtek ALC3234	Intel Wireless-AC 7265 (802.11ac 2x2) Dell Wireless: 1707 (802.11n 1x1)	Anti-glare LED	1366×768 1920×1080	15.6	23	380	259		
3540	2013	Intel Core 4th Gen Haswell ULV Up to 4500u		DDR3L-1600	16 GB (2 slots)	Intel HD 4400; Option + AMD HD 8550M		Intel Wireless-N 7260 (802.11ac 2x2) Dell Wireless: 1705 (802.11.n 1x1)	Anti-glare LED (opt. + 2 finger multi-touch)	1366×768 1920×1080	15.6					
14"
3470	2013	Intel Core 6th Gen Skylake ULV		DDR3L-1600	16 GB (2 slots)	Intel HD 520; Option + NVIDIA GeForce 920M		Intel Wireless-AC 3165 (802.11ac 1x1) or 8260 (802.11ac 2x2) or Wireless-N 7265 (802.11n) Dell Wireless 1802 (802.11ac 2x2)	Anti-glare LED	1366×768 1920×1080	14.0	23.15	342	243	1.8 kg (4 cell)	
3460	2014	Intel Core 5th Gen Broadwell ULV Up to 5500u		DDR3L-1600	16 GB (2 slots)	Intel HD 5500; Option + NVIDIA GeForce 920M		Intel Wireless-AC 3165 (802.11ac 1x1) or 8260 (802.11ac 2x2) or Wireless-N 7265 (802.11n) Dell Wireless 1802 (802.11ac 2x2)	Anti-glare LED	1366×768 1920×1080	14.0	23.15	342	243	1.8 kg (4 cell)	
3450	2014	Intel Core 5th Gen Broadwell ULV Up to 5500u		DDR3L-1600	16 GB (2 slots)	Intel HD Graphics 4400; Option + NVIDIA GeForce 830M	Realtek ALC3234	Intel Wireless-AC 7265 (802.11ac 2x2) Dell Wireless: 1707 (802.11n 1x1)	Anti-glare LED	1366×768	14.0					
3440	2013	Intel Core 4th Gen Haswell ULV Up to 4500u		DDR3L-1600	16 GB (2 slots)	Intel HD Graphics 4400; Option + AMD HD 8550M		Intel Wireless-N 7260 (802.11ac 2x2) Dell Wireless: 1705 (802.11.n 1x1)	Anti-glare LED	1366×768 1600×900	14.0					
13"
3379	2016	6th Gen Intel Core 6th Gen: i3-6100U; i5-6200U; i5-6300U; Intel Pentium 4405U (2M Cache, up to 2.1 GHz)		DDR4	Up to 16 GB (2 SODIMM slots)	Intel HD Graphics 510 (Pentium models); Intel HD Graphics 520 (i3/i5 models)	Realtek ALC3253 with Waves MaxxAudio pro	802.11ac + Bluetooth 4.0, Dual Band 2.4 & 5 GHz, 2x2	Truelife LED-Backlit Touch Display with Wide Viewing Angle	1920×1080	13.30"	18.70	322.40	224.00	1.75 kg	Windows 10
3350	2015	Intel Celeron; Intel Pentium; Intel Core 5th Gen		DDR3L-1600	4 GB, 8 GB (2 SODIMM slots)	Intel HD Graphics (Celeron models); Intel HD 4400 Graphics (i3/i5 models)	Realtek ALC3234		Anti-glare WLED	1366×768	13.30"					
3340	2014	Intel Celeron Intel Core 4th Gen	Intel Lynx point-LP	DDR3L-1600	2 GB, 4 GB, 8 GB (2 SODIMM slots)	Intel HD Graphics (Celeron models); Intel HD 4400 Graphics (i3/i5 models)	Realtek ALC3234		Anti-glare LED	1366×768	13.30"	22.70 to 35.90	330.90	243.2	1.68 kg	
3330	2013	Intel IVB ULV 17 W (Celeron, i3, i5) Intel SNB ULV 17 W (i3)	Intel HM77 Express Chipset	DDR3-1333 (Sandy Bridge models); DDR3L-1600 (Ivy Bridge models)	8 GB (2 SODIMM slots)	Intel HD Graphics (Celeron models); Intel HD 3000 Graphics (Sandy Bridge models); Intel HD 4000 Graphics (Ivy Bridge models)	IDT 92HD93		Anti-glare WLED	1366×768	13.30"	21 to 32.00	329.30	237.65	1.55 kg	
11.6"
3160	2015	Intel Celeron N30xx/Intel Pentium N37xx		DDR3L-1600	2 GB, 4 GB, 8 GB (1 SODIMM slot)	Intel HD Graphics	Realtek ALC3234–CG	Intel Dual Band Wireless- 7265 802.11AC Intel Dual Band Wireless- 7265 802.11AGN	Anti-glare LED	1366×768	11.6"	22.90	301.00	212.00	1.68 kg	
3150	2015	Intel Celeron N2840/Intel Pentium N3540		DDR3L-1333	2 GB, 4 GB, 8 GB (1 SODIMM slot)	Intel HD Graphics	Realtek ALC3234-CG	Intel Dual Band Wireless- 7265 802.11AC Intel Dual Band Wireless- 7265 802.11AGN	Anti-glare LED	1366×768	11.6"	22.90	301.00	212.00	1.68 kg	
10.1"
2120	2011	Intel Atom N455/N550	NM10	DDR3	2 GB (1 slot)	Intel GMA 3150; Option + Broadcom Crystal HD Media Accelerator			Anti-glare LED	1024×600, 1366×768	10.1"					
2110	2010	Intel Atom N470	NM10	DDR2	2 GB (1 slot)	Intel GMA 3150; Option + Broadcom Crystal HD Media Accelerator			Anti-glare LED	1024×600, 1366×768	10.1"					
2100	2009	Intel Atom N270	945PM	DDR2	512 MB or 1 GB (integrated memory option) 2 GB (1 slot)	Intel GMA 950		Dell Wireless 1397, Dell Wireless 1510, Intel WiFi Link 5100, or Intel WiFi Link 5300	LED (touchscreen optional)	1024×576	10.1"					
Gray colored cards - switchable graphics (AMD Dynamic Switchable Graphics or Nvidia Optimus); Red colored cards - non-switchable discrete graphics (may be changed for purchase time only)

=== D-Family (2003-2007) ===
Model	Release	Cousin model	CPU	Chipset	Memory		Graphics			Audio codec	Network card	Screen			Dimensions (mm)			Weight	Battery
Model	Release	Cousin model	CPU	Chipset	Type	Maximum	Type	Clock rate	Controller	Audio codec	Network card	Type	Resolution	"	Height	Width	Depth	Weight	Battery
12.1" ultraportable
D430	2007		Intel Core Solo ULV, Core 2 Duo ULV (533 MHz FSB)	Intel 945GMS	DDR2 – 533 MHz	2 GB (1 slot, 1 GB soldered)	Integrated (chipset)	400 MHz	Intel GMA 950	SigmaTel STAC 92XX	LAN: Broadcom BCM57xx GbE WLAN: Broadcom 43xx (Dell) or Intel: 3945 802.11a/b/g or 4965 802.11a/b/g/draft-n		1280×800	12.1"	25.4	295	210	1.36 kg	
D420	2006		Intel Core Solo ULV, Core Duo U2500 1.2 GHz	Intel 945GMS	DDR2 – 533 MHz	2.5 GB (1 slot, 512 MB soldered)	Integrated (chipset)	400 MHz	Intel GMA 950		LAN: Broadcom BCM57xx GbE; WLAN: Broadcom 43xx (Dell) 802.11a/b/g or Intel 3945		1280×800	12.1"	25.4	295	210	1.36 kg	
D410	2005		Intel Centrino M /Pentium M ULV (Dothan)	Intel 915GM	DDR2 – 533 MHz	2 GB (2 slots)	Integrated (chipset)		Intel GMA 900	(Soft Audio)			1024×768 32 bpp	12.1"	31.9	278	238	1.7 kg	Warning icon
D400	2004		Intel Centrino M /Pentium M ULV (Banias)	Intel 855GM	DDR1 – 266 MHz	2 GB (2 slots)	Integrated (chipset)		Intel Extreme Graphics 2	(Soft Audio)	LAN:Broadcom 5705M gigabit controller WLAN: Broadcom BCM4306 802.11a/b/g (Dell 1450 miniPCI)	CCFL	1024×768 32 bpp	12.1"	25.4	294	245	1.7 kg	
15" case
D531	2007		AMD Turion 64 X2 Dual Core	AMD M690T	DDR2 – 667 MHz	8 GB (Note: officially supported 4 GB) (2 slots)	ATi (AMD); Integrated (chipset)		ATi (AMD) Radeon x1270	SigmaTel STAC9205	LAN: Broadcom BCM5755M GbE; WLAN:Dell (1390 802.11b/g, 1450 802.11a/b/g, 1505 802.11draft-n)		1280×800	14.1"	35.3	365.7	262,5	2.3 kg	
D531	2007		AMD Turion 64 X2 Dual Core	AMD M690T	DDR2 – 667 MHz	8 GB (2 slots)	ATi (AMD); Integrated (chipset)		ATi (AMD) Radeon x1270	SigmaTel STAC9205	LAN: Broadcom BCM5755M GbE; WLAN:Dell (1390 802.11b/g, 1450 802.11a/b/g, 1505 802.11draft-n)		1280×800, 1440×900	15.4"	35.3	365.7	262,5	2.3 kg	
D530	2007		Intel Core 2 Duo (800 MHz FSB)	Intel 965GM	DDR2 – 667 MHz	8 GB (2 slots)	Integrated (chipset)	500 MHz	Intel GMA X3100		LAN: Broadcom BCM5755M GbE			15.4"	35.3		262,5		
D520	2006		Intel Core Duo, Core 2 Duo, Celeron M	Intel 945GM (Core Duo); Intel 940GML (Celeron M)	DDR2 – 533/667 MHz	4 GB (Note: Usable RAM limited to 3.25 GB by chipset)(945GM) 2 GB (940GML) (2 slots)	Integrated (chipset)	400 MHz	Intel GMA 950		LAN: Broadcom 440x 10/100 Ethernet; WLAN:Broadcom 43xx (Dell) 802.11b/g or a/b/g or Intel 3945		1024×768	14.1"	35.8	338.3	273	2.38 kg	Warning icon
D520	2006		Intel Core Duo, Core 2 Duo, Celeron M	Intel 945GM (Core Duo); Intel 940GML (Celeron M)	DDR2 – 533/667 MHz	4 GB(945GM) 2 GB (940GML) (2 slots)	Integrated (chipset)	400 MHz	Intel GMA 950		LAN: Broadcom 440x 10/100 Ethernet; WLAN:Broadcom 43xx (Dell) 802.11b/g or a/b/g or Intel 3945		1024×768, 1400×1050	15.4"	35.8	338.3	273	2.38 kg	Warning icon
D510	2005		Intel Pentium M 730 (2 MB L2) 533 MHz FSB / Celeron M	Intel 915GM	DDR2 – 400/533 MHz	2 GB (2 slots)	Integrated (chipset)	333 MHz	Intel GMA 900	SigmaTel STAC9205	LAN: Broadcom 440x 10/100 Ethernet WLAN: Intel PRO 2200 (802.11b/g) Modem: V.92 capable 56K		1024×768	14.1"					Warning icon
D505	2004	Inspiron 510m	Intel Pentium M Banias (1 MB L2) or Dothan (2 MB L2) 1.3 - 2.0 GHz (400 MHz FSB); Celeron M	Intel 855GME	DDR1 – 333 MHz	2 GB (2 slots)	Integrated (chipset)		Intel Extreme Graphics 2		LAN: Broadcom 570x gigabit controller WLAN: Intel: PRO 2100 (802.11b) or PRO 2200 (802.11b/g)) or TrueMobile (1350 (802.11b/g) or 1450 (802.11a/b/g)); Bluetooth: optional		1024×768	14.1"	31.8	338.3	273		Warning icon
D505	2004	Inspiron 510m	Intel Pentium M Banias (1 MB L2) or Dothan (2 MB L2) 1.3 - 2.0 GHz (400 MHz FSB); Celeron M	Intel 855GME	DDR1 – 333 MHz	2 GB (2 slots)	Integrated (chipset)		Intel Extreme Graphics 2		LAN: Broadcom 570x gigabit controller WLAN: Intel: PRO 2100 (802.11b) or PRO 2200 (802.11b/g)) or TrueMobile (1350 (802.11b/g) or 1450 (802.11a/b/g)); Bluetooth: optional		1024×768, 1400×1050	15.4"	31.8	338.3	273		Warning icon
D500 (Note: This Laptop is a clone of a Dell Latitude D600)	2003	Inspiron 500m	Intel Pentium M Banias (1 MB L2) or Dothan (2 MB L2) 1.3 - 2.0 GHz (400 MHz FSB); Celeron M	Intel 855GM	DDR1 – 266 MHz	2 GB (2 slots)	Integrated (chipset)		Intel Extreme Graphics 2		LAN: Broadcom 570x gigabit controller WLAN: Intel: PRO 2100 (802.11b) or PRO 2200 (802.11b/g) or TrueMobile: 1300/1350 (802.11b/g) or 1400/1450 (802.11a/b/g); Bluetooth: optional	CCFL	1024×768; 32 bpp	14.1"					Warning icon
14" case
D631	2007		AMD Turion 64 X2 Dual Core	AMD RS690T	DDR2 – 667 MHz	8 GB (2 slots)	ATi (AMD) Integrated		ATi (AMD) Radeon x1270	SigmaTel STAC9205	Dell: 1390 802.11b/g, 1490 802.11a/b/g, 1505 802.11a/b/g/draft-n		1280×800, 1440×900	14.1	32	338	238	2.7 kg	
D630	2007	Precision M2300	Intel Core 2 Duo (800 MHz FSB)	Intel 965GM	DDR2 – 667 MHz	8 GB (2 slots)	Integrated (chipset) or discrete	500 MHz	Intel GMA X3100		Intel: 3945 802.11a/b/g, 4965 802.11a/b/g/draft-n, Dell: 1390 802.11b/g, 1490 802.11a/b/g, 1505 802.11a/b/g/draft-n		1280×800 1440×900	14.1	32	338	238	2 kg	
D630	2007	Precision M2300	Intel Core 2 Duo (800 MHz FSB)	Intel 965GM	DDR2 – 667 MHz	8 GB (2 slots)	Integrated (chipset) or discrete	667 MHz	NVIDIA Quadro NVS 135M (128 MB)		Intel: 3945 802.11a/b/g, 4965 802.11a/b/g/draft-n, Dell: 1390 802.11b/g, 1490 802.11a/b/g, 1505 802.11a/b/g/draft-n		1280×800 1440×900	14.1	32	338	238	2 kg	
D620	2006		Core 2 Duo (667 MHz FSB); Intel Core Duo (533 MHz FSB)	Intel 945GM	DDR2 – 667 MHz	4 GB (2 slots)	Integrated (chipset) or discrete	300 MHz	Intel GMA 950		Intel 3945 802.11a/b/g, Dell: 1390 802.11b/g, 1490 802.11a/b/g		1280×800 1440×900	14.1	32	338	238	2 kg	Warning icon
D620	2006		Core 2 Duo (667 MHz FSB); Intel Core Duo (533 MHz FSB)	Intel 945PM	DDR2 – 667 MHz	4 GB (2 slots)	Integrated (chipset) or discrete	300 MHz	NVIDIA Quadro NVS 110 (256 MB)		Intel 3945 802.11a/b/g, Dell: 1390 802.11b/g, 1490 802.11a/b/g		1280×800 1440×900	14.1	32	338	238	2 kg	Warning icon
D610	2005	Precision M20	Intel Pentium M Dothan (2 MB L2) up to 2.13 GHz	Intel 915GM	DDR2 – 533 MHz	2 GB (2 slots)	Integrated (chipset) or discrete	350 MHz	Intel GMA 900	SigmaTel C-Major; STAC9751	LAN: Broadcom 57xx Gigabit controller WLAN: Intel (PRO 2200 (802.11b/g) or PRO/Wireless 2915ABG) or Dell 1370; Bluetooth: Dell Wireless 350 (optional)		1024×768 1400×1050 32 bpp (Note: integrated graphics chipset supports up to 1600×1200 pixels / Mobility Radeon X300 supports up to 2048×1152 pixels with external monitor)	14.1	34	312.5	261	2.1 kg	Warning icon
D610	2005	Precision M20	Intel Pentium M Dothan (2 MB L2) up to 2.13 GHz	Intel 915PM	DDR2 – 533 MHz	2 GB (2 slots)	Integrated (chipset) or discrete	350 MHz	ATI Mobility Radeon X300 (64 MB DDR)	SigmaTel C-Major; STAC9751	LAN: Broadcom 57xx Gigabit controller WLAN: Intel (PRO 2200 (802.11b/g) or PRO/Wireless 2915ABG) or Dell 1370; Bluetooth: Dell Wireless 350 (optional)		1024×768 1400×1050 32 bpp	14.1	34	312.5	261	2.1 kg	Warning icon
D600	2003	Inspiron 600m	Intel Pentium M Banias (1 MB L2) or Dothan (2 MB L2) 1.3 - 2.0 GHz (400 MHz FSB)	Intel 855PM	DDR1 – 266 MHz	2 GB (2 slots)	Discrete	200 MHz	ATI Mobility Radeon 9000 (32/64 MB)	SigmaTel C-Major; STAC9750	LAN: Broadcom 570x Gigabit controller WLAN: Intel: PRO 2100 (802.11b) or PRO 2200 (802.11b/g) or TrueMobile: 1300/1350 (802.11b/g) or 1400/1450 (802.11a/b/g); Bluetooth: optional	CCFL	1400×1050; 32 bpp or 1024×768; 24 bpp	14.1	30.5	315	256,5	2.1 kg	Warning icon
15" case, performance
D830	2007	Precision M4300	Intel Core 2 Duo (800 MHz FSB)	Intel 965GM	DDR2 – 667 MHz	8 GB (2 slots)	Integrated (chipset) or discrete		Intel GMA X3100		Intel: 3945 802.11a/b/g, 4965 802.11a/b/g/draft-n, Dell: 1390 802.11b/g, 1490 802.11a/b/g, 1505 802.11a/b/g/draft-n		1280×800; 1680×1050; 1920×1200	15.4"					
D830	2007	Precision M4300	Intel Core 2 Duo (800 MHz FSB)	Intel 965PM	DDR2 – 667 MHz	8 GB (2 slots)	Integrated (chipset) or discrete	NVIDIA Quadro NVS 135M (256 MB)			Intel: 3945 802.11a/b/g, 4965 802.11a/b/g/draft-n, Dell: 1390 802.11b/g, 1490 802.11a/b/g, 1505 802.11a/b/g/draft-n		1280×800; 1680×1050; 1920×1200	15.4"					
D830	2007	Precision M4300	Intel Core 2 Duo (800 MHz FSB)	Intel 965PM	DDR2 – 667 MHz	8 GB (2 slots)	Integrated (chipset) or discrete		or Quadro NVS 140M (256 MB)		Intel: 3945 802.11a/b/g, 4965 802.11a/b/g/draft-n, Dell: 1390 802.11b/g, 1490 802.11a/b/g, 1505 802.11a/b/g/draft-n		1280×800; 1680×1050; 1920×1200	15.4"					
D820	2006	Precision M65	Core 2 Duo (667 MHz FSB); Intel Core Duo (533 MHz FSB)	Intel 945GM	DDR2 – 667 MHz	4 GB (2 slots)	Integrated (chipset) or discrete		Intel GMA 950		LAN: Broadcom 57xx Gigabit controller WLAN: Intel 3945 802.11a/b/g, Dell 1490 802.11a/b/g		1280×800; 1680×1050 1920×1200	15.4"	38	368	266.5		
D820	2006	Precision M65	Core 2 Duo (667 MHz FSB); Intel Core Duo (533 MHz FSB)	Intel 945PM	DDR2 – 667 MHz	4 GB (2 slots)	Integrated (chipset) or discrete		or NVIDIA Quadro NVS 120 (256 MB)		LAN: Broadcom 57xx Gigabit controller WLAN: Intel 3945 802.11a/b/g, Dell 1490 802.11a/b/g		1280×800; 1680×1050 1920×1200	15.4"	38	368	266.5		
D810	2005	Precision M70	Intel Pentium M Dothan (2 MB L2) up to 2.26 GHz	Intel 915PM	DDR2 – 533 MHz	2 GB (2 slots)	Discrete		ATI Mobility Radeon x300 (64/128 MB)					15.4"					Warning icon
D810	2005	Precision M70	Intel Pentium M Dothan (2 MB L2) up to 2.26 GHz	Intel 915PM	DDR2 – 533 MHz	2 GB (2 slots)	Discrete		or Mobility Radeon x600 (128 MB)					15.4"					Warning icon
D800	2003	Inspiron 8500 Inspiron 8600 Precision M60	Intel Pentium M Banias (1 MB L2) or Dothan (2 MB L2) 1.3 - 1.8 GHz (400 MHz FSB)	Intel 855PM	DDR1 – 266 MHz	2 GB (2 slots)	Discrete		nVidia GeForce4 4200 Go (32 MB)			CCFL		15.4"					Warning icon
D800	2003	Inspiron 8500 Inspiron 8600 Precision M60	Intel Pentium M Banias (1 MB L2) or Dothan (2 MB L2) 1.3 - 1.8 GHz (400 MHz FSB)	Intel 855PM	DDR1 – 266 MHz	2 GB (2 slots)	Discrete		or GeForce FX Go5200 (32/64 MB			CCFL		15.4"					Warning icon
D800	2003	Inspiron 8500 Inspiron 8600 Precision M60	Intel Pentium M Banias (1 MB L2) or Dothan (2 MB L2) 1.3 - 1.8 GHz (400 MHz FSB)	Intel 855PM	DDR1 – 266 MHz	2 GB (2 slots)	Discrete		or GeForce FX Go5650 (128 MB			CCFL		15.4"					Warning icon

=== X-Family (2002-2011) ===
Model	Release	Inspiron cousin	CPU	Chipset	Memory		Graphics				Audio codec	Network card	Screen		Dimensions (mm)			Weight	Operating System
Model	Release	Inspiron cousin	CPU	Chipset	Type	Maximum	Type	Clock rate	Controller	Allocated memory	Audio codec	Network card	Type	Maximum resolution	Height	Width	Depth	Weight	Operating System
12.1" Convertible Tablet PC
XT3	2011		Up to an Intel Core i7-2640m	Intel QM67	DDR3 – 1333 mHz	16 GB ( 2 slots )	Integrated (chipset)	1.30 GHz	Intel HD 3000	Dynamically assigned up to 2 GB	IDT HD92xx	WLAN: Intel Centrino: Advanced-N 6205 or Ultimate-N 6300; or Dell Wireless: 1501 (802.11b/g/n 1x1); or 1530 (802.11a/g/n 2x2)	IPS LED	1366×768	30.9	323	221.7	2.02 kg (6 cell stock)	
XT2	2008		Intel Core 2 Duo (1.2, 1.4 or 1.6 GHz)	Intel GS45 (Note: GM45 in small package)	DDR3 –800 MHz	5 GB (1 GB soldered + 1 slot)	Integrated (chipset)	475 MHz	Intel GMA 4500MHD	up to 384 MB	IDT 92HD71B7	LAN:Intel 82567LF Gigabit Network (10/100/1000 Mbit/s); WLAN:Intel Wi-Fi Link (5100AGN or 5300AGN) or Dell Wireless (1397 (802.11g) or 1510 (802.11a/g/n 2x2))	LED	1280×768 32 bpp	27.4	220.6	297	1.62 kg (28 WHr battery)	
XT	2007		Intel Core 2 Duo (1.33 GHz) U7700	Radeon Xpress 1250	DDR2 –667 MHz	3 GB (1 GB soldered + 1 slot)	Integrated (chipset)	350 MHz	ATI Radeon X300	up to 384 MB	SigmaTel STAC9205	Broadcom NetXtreme Gigabit Ethernet (10/100/1000 Mbit/s); WLAN: Intel Wireless Wi-Fi Link 4965AGN	400 cd/m2 CCFL or 230 cd/m2 LED	1280×768 32 bpp	25	218	297	1.69 kg (42 WHr battery)	
12.1"
X1 (Note: fanless computer using 1.8-inch PATA HDD)	2005		Intel Pentium M	Intel 915GMS	DDR2 –400 MHz	2.25 GB (256 MB soldered + 1 slot)	Integrated (chipset)	350 MHz	Intel GMA 900		SigmaTel C-Major; STAC9751	Broadcom NetXtreme BCM5751 Gigabit Ethernet PCI Express; MiniPCI card for Wireless LAN	CCFL	1280×768 32 bpp	25	286	196.8	1.14 kg (27-WHr battery)	
X300	2003	300M	Intel Pentium M	Intel 855GM	DDR1 – 266 MHz	1.15 GB (128 MB soldered + 1 slot)	Integrated (chipset)	133 MHz	Intel Extreme Graphics 2	32 - 64	SigmaTel C-Major; STAC9750	Broadcom 570x Gigabit Series	CCFL	1024×768 32 bpp	22.2	275	233.6	1.31 kg (28-WHr battery)	
X200	2002		Intel Pentium III Mobile	Intel 830MG	SDRAM – 133 MHz	630 MB (128 MB soldered + 1 slot)	Integrated (chipset)	133 MHz	Intel Extreme Graphics	32 - 48	Cirrus Logic CS4299	3c905C-TX	CCFL	1024×768 18 bpp	≈24	273	226	1.31 kg (27-WHr battery)	

=== V-Family (2000-2002) ===
Model	Release	Cousin model	CPU	Chipset	Memory		Graphics				Audio codec	NIC modem / wireless	Screen			Dimensions (mm)			Weight	Operating System
Model	Release	Cousin model	CPU	Chipset	Type	Maximum	Type	Clock rate	Controller	Allocated memory	Audio codec	NIC modem / wireless	Type	Resolution	"	Height	Width	Depth	Weight	Operating System
V700	2000	Inspiron 2500	Intel PIII Mobile	Intel 815E	SDRAM – 100 MHz	512 MB (2 slots)	Integrated (chipset)		3D graphics with Direct AGP	32 MB	SigmaTel C-Major; STAC9700	3Com 10/100 LAN; 56K V.90 Mini-PCI modem	CCFL	1024×768 32 bpp	14.1"					
V710	2001	Inspiron 2600	Intel PIII Mobile	Intel 830M	SDRAM– 133 MHz	512 MB (2 slots)	Integrated (chipset)	166 MHz	Intel Extreme Graphics	32 or 64 MB	SigmaTel C-Major; STAC9700	3Com 10/100 LAN; 56K V.90 Mini-PCI modem	CCFL	1024×768 32 bpp	14.1"	37	328	274	3.2 kg	
V740	2002	Inspiron 2650	Intel P4-M	Intel 845 MP	DDR1 – 266 MHz	512 MB (2 slots)	Discrete		Nvidia GeForce2 Go (16 or 32 MB)		SigmaTel C-Major; STAC9700	3Com 10/100 LAN; 56K V.90 Mini-PCI modem	CCFL	1024×768 32 bpp	14.1"	36	328	275	3.2 kg	

=== C-Family (1999-2002) ===
All screens have a TN active-LCD matrix and a CCFL backlit.

Model	Release	Cousin model	CPU	Chipset	Memory		Graphics				Audio codec	NIC modem / wireless	Screen			Dimensions (mm)			Weight	Operating System
Model	Release	Cousin model	CPU	Chipset	Type	Maximum	Type	Clock rate	Controller	Allocated memory	Audio codec	NIC modem / wireless	Type	Resolution	"	Height	Width	Depth	Weight	Operating System
C400	2001		Intel PIII Mobile	Intel 830M	SDRAM– 133 MHz	1 GB (2 slots) (Note: 1 user-accessible)	Integrated (chipset)	166 MHz	Intel Extreme Graphics	32 or 64 MB	Cirrus Logic CS4205	3Com 10/100 LAN	CCFL	1024×768 18 bpp	12.1"	26.6-30.5	290	238	1.63 kg (4-cell battery)	
C540	2002	Inspiron 4100	Mobile Intel Celeron	Intel 845M	DDR1 – 266 MHz	1 GB (2 slots)	Discrete		ATI Mobility Radeon 7500C (32 MB)		Cirrus Logic CS4205	V.92 capable 56K MDC softmodem	CCFL	1400×1050 32 bpp	14.1"	36,5	319	254	5.73 lb (Note: with CD-ROM module)	
C510	2001	Inspiron 4000	Intel Celeron (Pentium III-based) Mobile	Intel 830M	SDRAM – 133 MHz	1 GB (2 slots)	Discrete		ATI Mobility Radeon M6P (16 MB)		Cirrus Logic CS4205	Dell TrueMobile 1150 Mini-PCI Wireless (Note: Optional)	CCFL	1024×768 32 bpp	14.1"	36,5	319	254	5.73 lb	
C500	2000	Inspiron 4000	Intel Celeron Mobile mini-ZIF	Intel 440BX	SDRAM – 66/100 MHz (Note: PC66, or PC100 specially selected RAM)	512 MB (2 slots)	Discrete	133 MHz	ATi Mobility Radeon M3 (8 MB)		ESS Maestro 3i	3Com 10/100 LAN; 56K V.90 Mini-PCI modem	CCFL	800×600, 1024×768 16 bpp	12.1" / 14.1"					
C640	2002	Inspiron 4150	Intel Pentium 4-M	Intel 845M	DDR1 – 266 MHz	2 GB (Note: Motherboard supports 1 GB SODIMMs (unavailable at time of laptop release, regular configuration is 2x215 MB)) (2 slots)	Discrete		ATI Mobility Radeon 7500C (32 MB)		Cirrus Logic CS4205	V.92 capable 56K MDC softmodem	CCFL	1400×1050, 32 bpp	14.1"	36,5	319	254	5.73 lb	
C610	2001	Inspiron 4100	Intel PIII Mobile	Intel 830M	SDRAM – 133 MHz	1 GB (2 slots)	Discrete		ATI Mobility Radeon M6P (16 MB)		Cirrus Logic CS4205	Dell TrueMobile 1150 Mini-PCI Wireless	CCFL	1024×768, 1400×1050, 32 bpp	14.1"	36,5	319	254	5.73 lb	
C600	2000	Inspiron 4000	Intel PIII Mobile	Intel 440BX	SDRAM – 100 MHz	512 MB (2 slots)	Discrete	133 MHz	ATi Mobility Radeon M3 (8 MB)		ESS Maestro 3i	56K V.90 Mini-PCI modem	CCFL	1400×1050, 32 bpp, 1024×768 32 bpp	14.1"	38,5	319	254	5.51 lb	
C840	2002	Inspiron 8200; Precision M50	Intel P4-M	Intel 845 MP	DDR1 – 266 MHz	2 GB (2 slots)	Discrete	220 MHz	Nvidia GeForce4 440 Go (64 MB)		Cirrus Logic CS4205 (Note: on Intel 82801CAM ICH3-M South Bridge)	Mini-PCI Wireless card capable	CCFL	1600×1200, 32 bpp	15.1"					
C810	2001	Inspiron 8100; Precision M40	Intel PIII Mobile (Tualatin)	Intel 815EP-T	SDRAM – 133 MHz	512 MB (2 slots)	Discrete		Nvidia GeForce2 Go (16 or 32 MB)		ESS Maestro 3i	56K V.90 Mini-PCI modem	CCFL	1024×768, 1400×1050, 16 bpp	14.1 / 15"					
C800	2000	Inspiron 2500; Inspiron 8000	Intel PIII Mobile	Intel 815E	SDRAM – 100 MHz	512 MB (2 slots)	Discrete	105 MHz	ATi Mobility Radeon M4 (8 or 16 MB)		ESS Maestro 3i	56K V.90 Mini-PCI modem	CCFL	1600×1200, 32 bpp	15"	44,5	330	276	7.67 lb (Note: with FDD module)	
CPx J650GT	1999	Inspiron 3800	Intel PIII Mobile	Intel 440BX	SDRAM – 100 MHz	512 MB (2 slots)	Discrete		ATI Mobility Rage Pro M1 (4 MB)		ESS Maestro 3i	56K V.90 Mini-PCI modem	CCFL	1024×768 32 bpp	14.1"	45	320	255,5		

=== L-Family (1999-2006) ===
All screens have a TN active-LCD matrix and a CCFL-backlit.

Model	Release	Inspiron cousin	CPU	Chipset	Memory		Graphics				Audio codec	Network card	Screen			Dimensions (mm)			Weight	Operating System
Model	Release	Inspiron cousin	CPU	Chipset	Type	Maximum	Video type	Clock rate	Controller	Memory	Audio codec	Network card	Type	Resolution	"	Height	Width	Depth	Weight	Operating System
15.4"
131L	2006	1501	AMD Turion 64 X2	ATI Radeon Xpress 1150	DDR2 – 533 MHz	2 GB (2 slots)		400 MHz	ATI Radeon Xpress 1150 (integrated)	256 MB HyperMemory		Dell Wireless 1490 (802.11a/g)	CCFL	1280×800	14,1 / 15,4	36	356	266	2.83 kg	
120L	2006	1300	Intel Pentium M or Intel Celeron M	Intel 910GML	DDR2 – 533 MHz	2 GB (2 slots)			Intel GMA 900	Up to 128 MB	Sigmatel STAC9200	Dell Wireless 1470/1370	CCFL	1280×800	14/15.6	36	356	266	2.85 kg	
110L	2005	1000	Intel Pentium M or Intel Celeron M	Intel 910GML	DDR1	1 GB (1 slot)		400 MHz	Intel GMA 900	Up to 128 MB	SigmaTel STAC9752AT		CCFL	1024×768	14.1" / 15	37.2	330	268	2.8 kg (w/ 14.1-inch display and 8-cell lithium ion); 2.9 kg (w/ 14.1-inch display and 8-cell NiMH battery); 2.92 kg (w/ 15-inch display and 8-cell lithium-ion battery); 3.01 kg (w/ 15-inch display and 8-cell NiMH battery)	
100L	2004	1150	Intel Pentium 4 or Intel Celeron	Intel 852GMV	DDR	1 GB (2 slots)			Intel Extreme Graphics 2		SigmaTel 9750	Dell Wireless 1350 WLAN; Dell Wireless 1450 Dual Band WLAN	CCFL	1024×768	14.1" / 15	44.5-47.95 (14.1" models) 46.5-48.3 (15" models)	329 (14.1" models) 335 (15" models)	275	3.3 kg (w/ CD drive, 8-cell battery and 14.1"); 3.4 kg (w/ CD drive, 12-cell battery and 14.1"); 3.5 kg (w/ CD drive, 8-cell battery and 15"); 3.7 kg (w/ CD drive, 12-cell battery, and 15")	
12.1" ultraportable
L400	2001	2100	Intel Pentium III Mobile	Intel 440BX	SDRAM – 100 MHz	256 MB (1 slot)			ATI Mobility M	4 MB	Crystal CS4281 + CS4297A	3Com 3C920	CCFL	1024×768 18 bpp	12,1	25,7	272	220	1,63 kg 6-cell / 1,56 kg 4-cell	
LS	1999	2000	Intel Pentium III Mobile	Intel 440BX	SDRAM – 100 MHz	256 MB (1 slot)			NeoMagic NM2200	2,5 MB	NeoMagic NMG5		CCFL	800×600 18 bpp	12,1	25,7	272	220	1,66 kg 6-cell / 1,62 kg 4-cell	
11.3"
LT	1999		Intel Pentium MMX	Intel 430TX		64MB			NeoMagic MagicGraph 128XD (NM2160)	2 MB	Crystal CS4237B			800x600	11.3"					
10.4"
LX	1995		Intel 486DX4						Chips & Technologies 65545	1 MB										

=== CS-Family (1998-1999) ===
Model	Release	CPU	Chipset	Memory		Graphics				Audio codec	Network card	Screen			Dimensions (mm)			Weight	Operating System
Model	Release	CPU	Chipset	Type	Maximum	Type	Clock rate	Controller	Memory	Audio codec	Network card	Type	Resolution	"	Height	Width	Depth	Weight	Operating System
CS R	1999		Intel 440BX	SDRAM – 66 MHz	512 MB (2 slots)			NeoMagic MagicMedia 256 ZX	4 MB	NeoMagic MagicMedia 256 ZX		CCFL	800×600; 1024×768 16 bpp	13,3	29	306	246	1.89 kg 6-cell	
CSx	1999	Intel PIII Mobile	Intel 440BX	SDRAM – 66 MHz	512 MB (2 slots)			NeoMagic MagicMedia 256 ZX	4 MB	NeoMagic MagicMedia 256 ZX		CCFL	1024×768 16 bpp	13,3	29	306	246	1.95 kg 4-cell	
CS	1998	Intel PII Mobile	Intel 440BX	SDRAM – 66 MHz	512 MB (2 slots)			NeoMagic MagicMedia 256 ZX	4 MB	NeoMagic NM2360		CCFL	1024×768 16 bpp	13,3	29	306	246	1.95 kg 4-cell	

=== CP-Family (1997-1999) ===
Model	Release	CPU	Chipset	Memory		Graphics				Audio codec	Network card	Screen			Dimensions (mm)			Weight	Operating system
Model	Release	CPU	Chipset	Type	Maximum	Type	Clock rate	Controller	Memory	Audio codec	Network card	Type	Resolution	"	Height	Width	Depth	Weight	Operating system
CPx		Intel Pentium III 750 MHz;	Intel 440BX							ESS Maestro 2E; ESS Maestro 3I			1024x768	14.1					
CPi	1998 to 1999	Intel Pentium II 233-400 MHz	Intel 440BX	EDO(D series)/SDRAM(A series)	256 MB (2 slots) or 128 MB(2 slots) for D series	64-bit (128-bit hardware - accelerated) PCI		NeoMagic 2160	2.0 MB internal EDO RAM	Crystal 4237B / NeoMagic MagicMedia 256 (A models)		TFT	800×600; 1024×768	12.1; 13.3	44.1	306	241	2.8 kg	Windows NT 4.0, R3; Windows 95 OSR2; Windows 98 OSR1
CP	1997 to 1998	Intel Pentium MMX 166 to 233 MHz	Intel 430TX	EDO	128 MB (2 slots)			NeoMagic 2160	2.0 MB internal EDO RAM	Crystal 4237B		TFT	800×600	12.1	38.6	306	241	2.5 kg	

=== XP-Family (1994-1998) ===
The Latitude XP was introduced as the first laptop with an optional Lithium-ion battery. For XPi and earlier models, the BIOS limited storage to an 8.4 gb or smaller hard drive. The XPi CD was the last mass-market laptop with an optical trackball. In 1996, the XP line was updated with higher resolution screens and updated Pentium processors. A base model for business use known as LM was introduced, while the high-end models were renamed XPi. In 1997, the range would be upgraded to include Intel's MMX.

Model	Release	CPU	Chipset	Memory		Graphics				Audio	Network card	Screen			Dimensions (mm)			Weight	Operating System
Model	Release	CPU	Chipset	Type	Maximum	Type	Clock rate	Controller	Memory	Audio codec	Network card	Type	Resolution	"	Height	Width	Depth	Weight	Operating System
XPi CD	1996	Intel Pentium 150 or Pentium MMX @ 166 MHz	Pico Power Vesuvius-LS Core Logic	FPM/EDO	72/80 MB (2 slots, 8/16 MB soldered); 48 MB for a 150 MHz CPU			NeoMagic MagicGraph 128V (150 MHz) or 128ZV (166 MHz)	1.1MB	ESS AudioDrive ES1888 (150 MHz), or ES1887 (166 MHz)		TFT TN	800×600; 16 bpp	12.1"				3.4 kg	Windows 95
XPi	1995	Intel Pentium @ 75, 90, 100, 120, 133 MHz	Pico Power Golden Gate (PT80C732/PT80C733); Pico Power Vesuvius-LS	FPM/EDO	40 MB (2 slots, 8 MB soldered)			NeoMagic NM2070	1 MB	ESS AudioDrive ES1888		DSTN or TFT TN	640×480 or 800×600	10.5"					
XP	1994	Intel 486DX2 @50 MHz, 486DX4 @75 or 100 MHz	Western Digital 8110		38 MB (2 slots)							STN or TFT TN		9,5					

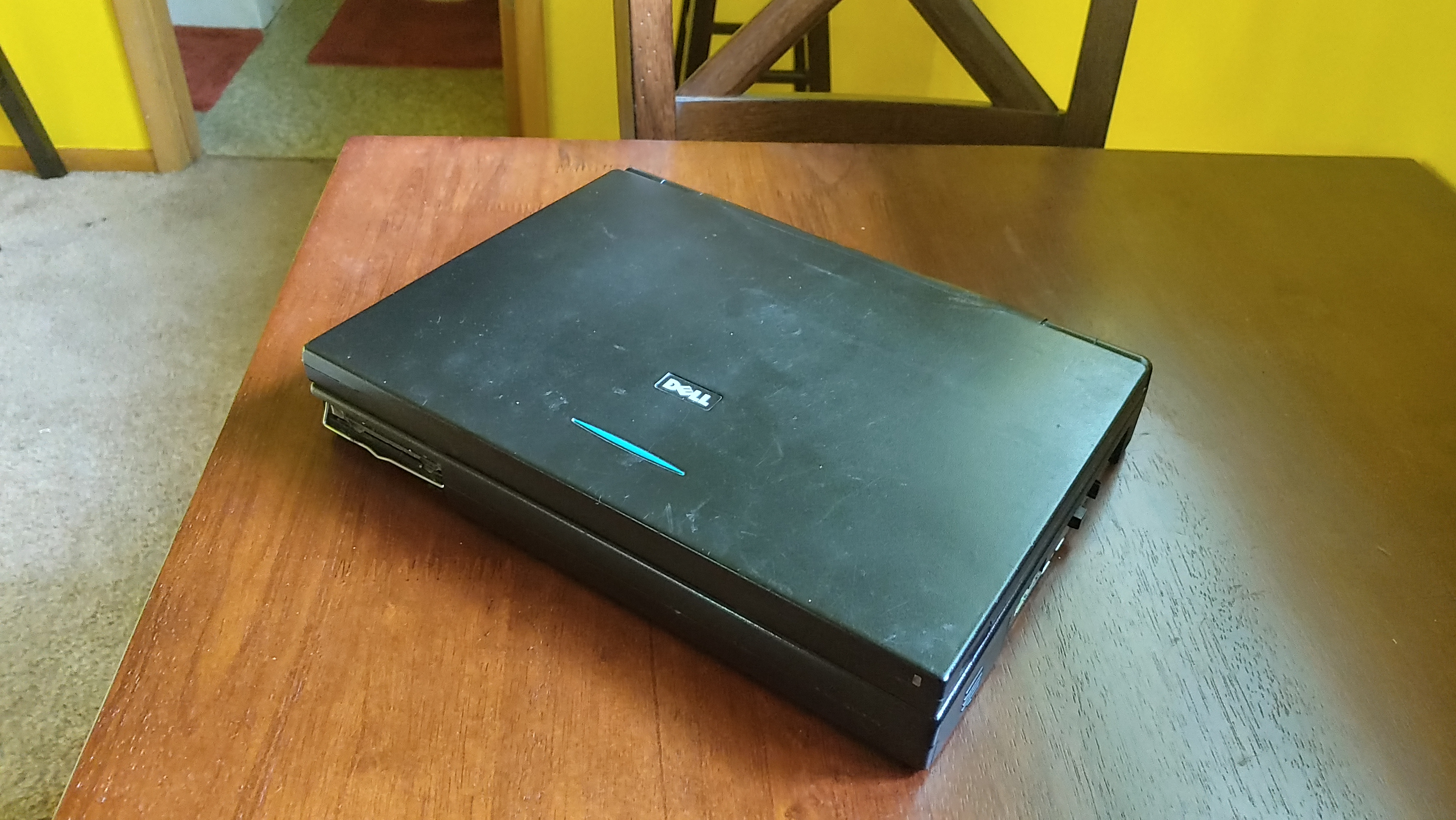
Dell Latitude LM, manufactured in late 1996. It is equipped with a 133 mhz Pentium processor, trackpad, CDROM drive, 12.1 inch TFT display, and is upgraded to the maximum of 40 megabytes of RAM.

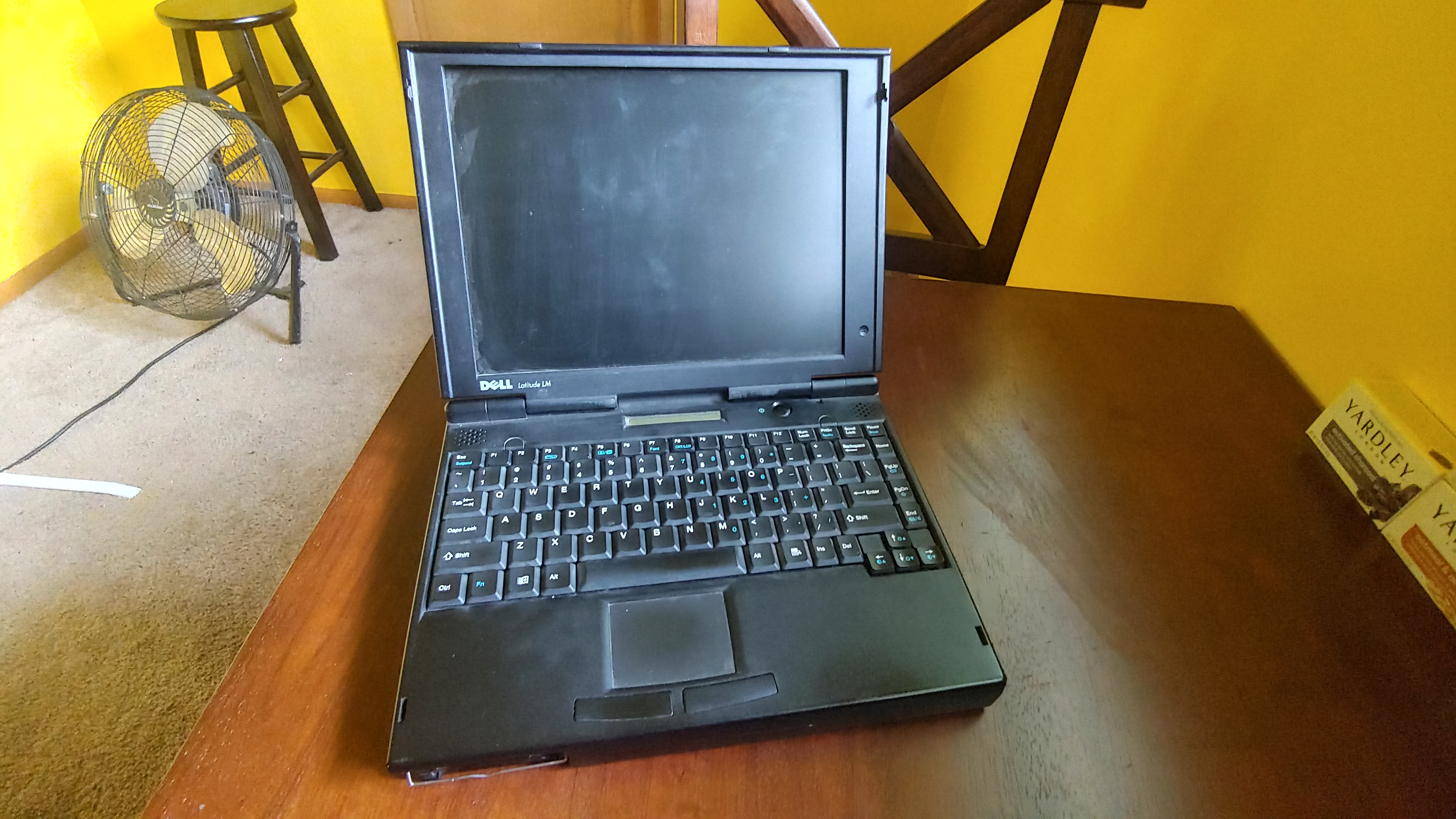
Display

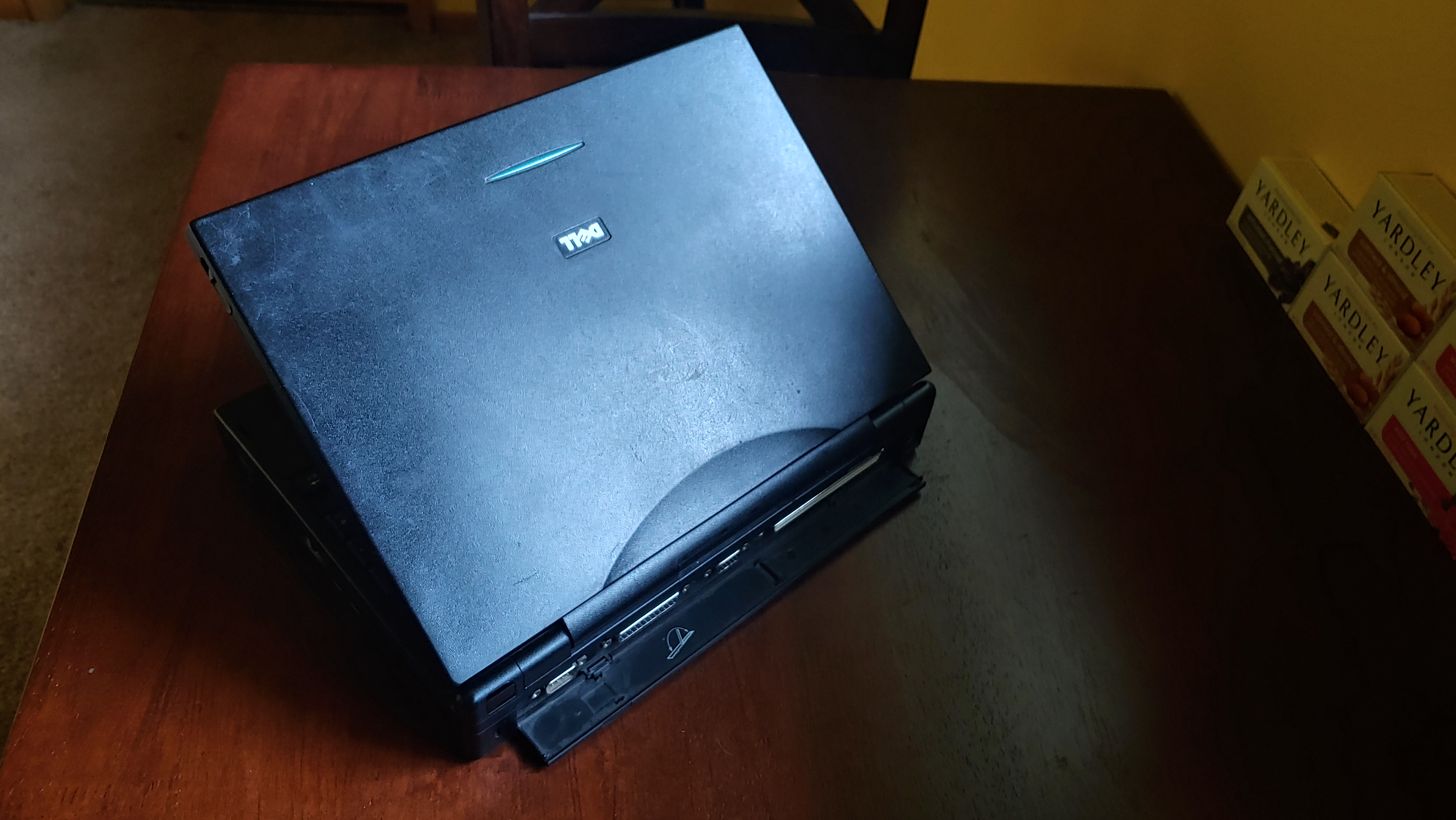
Ports

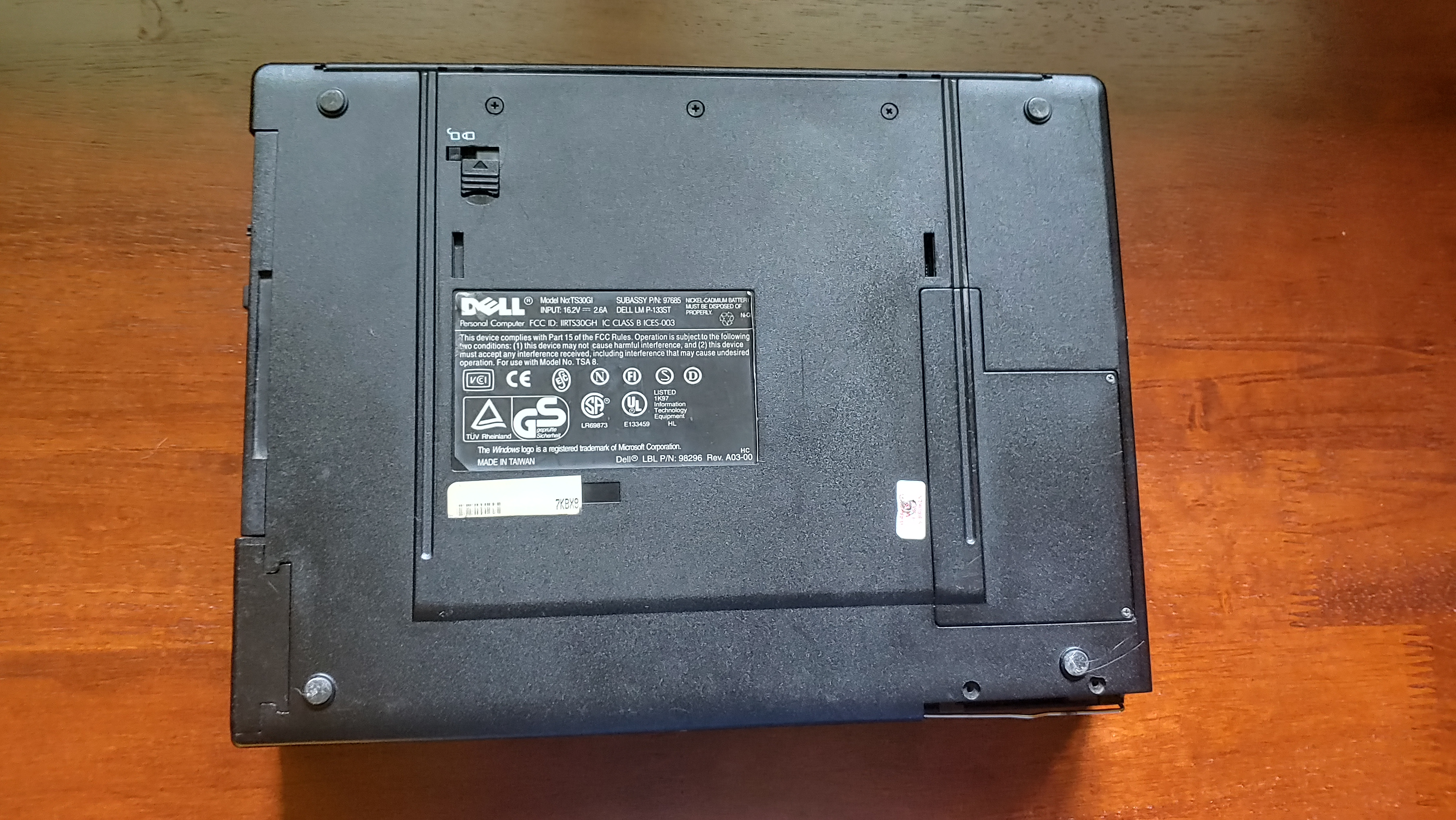
Serial number and specifications

== History ==
Announcements:

=== E-Family ===
- 2020: 18 June: E7270. E7470, E7870
- 2012: 21 May: E6230, E6330, E6430, E6430s, E6530, E5430, E5440, E5510, E5530, E6430 ATG
- 2011: 8 Feb: E5420, E5520, E6220, E6320, E6420, E6520, E6420 ATG laptops and XT3 convertible tablet
- 2010: 8 April: E6410, E6510, E6410 ATG
- 2008: 12 August: E-Family (E4200, E4300, E5400, E6500, E5500, E6400, E6400 ATG)

=== D-Family ===
- 2007: 28 June: D430; 9 May: D630, D830, D531; 16 January: ATG D620 announced
- 2006: 20 June: D420; 2 May: D520; 29 March: D620, D820 announced
- 2005: 26 April: D510; 1 February: D410, D610 and D810 announced
- 2004: 12 January: D505 announced
- 2003: 19 May: D400; 10 April: D500; 12 March: D-family (D600, D800) announced

=== C-Family ===
- 2002: 11 July: C640 announced
- 2001: 12 November: C400 announced
- 2000: 25 September: C600, C800 announced
- 1999: 25 October: CPx H500GT and CPt V466GT announced (some of the earlier Dell laptops lacked a built-in Ethernet network adapter well into the Internet age, CPx H500GT was one such model); 23 August: CS-line (R400XT); 14 June: CPi R400GT, CPi A400XT, and CPi A366ST; 4 May: CPt-line; 5 January: CPi A366XT and A300ST announced
- CPi D266XT (BIOS Ph 7/30/98-2001): PII-266, 512 KB cache, Intel i440BX; 13.3 1024×768 TFT; 256 MB max, 2 EDO SoDIMM slots; 4 - 20+ GB, two PCMCIA, two modular bays, PS/2, VGA, parallel, USB 1.1, audio in/out. Windows 98.
- 1997: C-family announced (with CP-line)

=== XPi-Family ===
- 1996: Latitude XPi P133ST (NeoMagic NM2070 video chipset, 24 MB of memory (8 MB soldered), 1.2 GB hard disk, PCMCIA modem card, 10.2" SVGA (800×600) TFT display, Windows 95 with possibility to partition and install Linux, Desktop Survival Guide)

=== Ultraportable ===
- 2007: 28 June: D430 announced
- 2005: 30 March: X1 announced
- 2003: 29 July: X300 announced
- 2002: 6 May: X200 announced
- 2000 4 October: LS H500ST announced

=== Value ===
- 2006: 6 November: 131L;23 March: 120L announced
- 2005: 8 March: 110L announced
- 2004: 13 April: 100L announced

The Latitude 100L is a near-clone of the Inspiron 1150 and is also closely related to the 1100, 5100, and 5150. The Latitude 110L is a near-clone of the Inspiron 1000.

== Repairability ==
The Dell Latitude E5270 (2017) scored a perfect 10 on iFixit. It is unclear whether other Latitude laptops have a similar form factor and are equivalently modular.

== See also ==
- Lenovo ThinkPad
- HP EliteBook and ZBook
- Dell Latitude, Precision and XPS
- Fujitsu Lifebook and Celsius
- Toshiba Portégé
- ASUS ExpertBook
- Acer TravelMate
