= Dell Inspiron desktop computers =

Desktop computer series by Dell

Dell Inspiron desktops

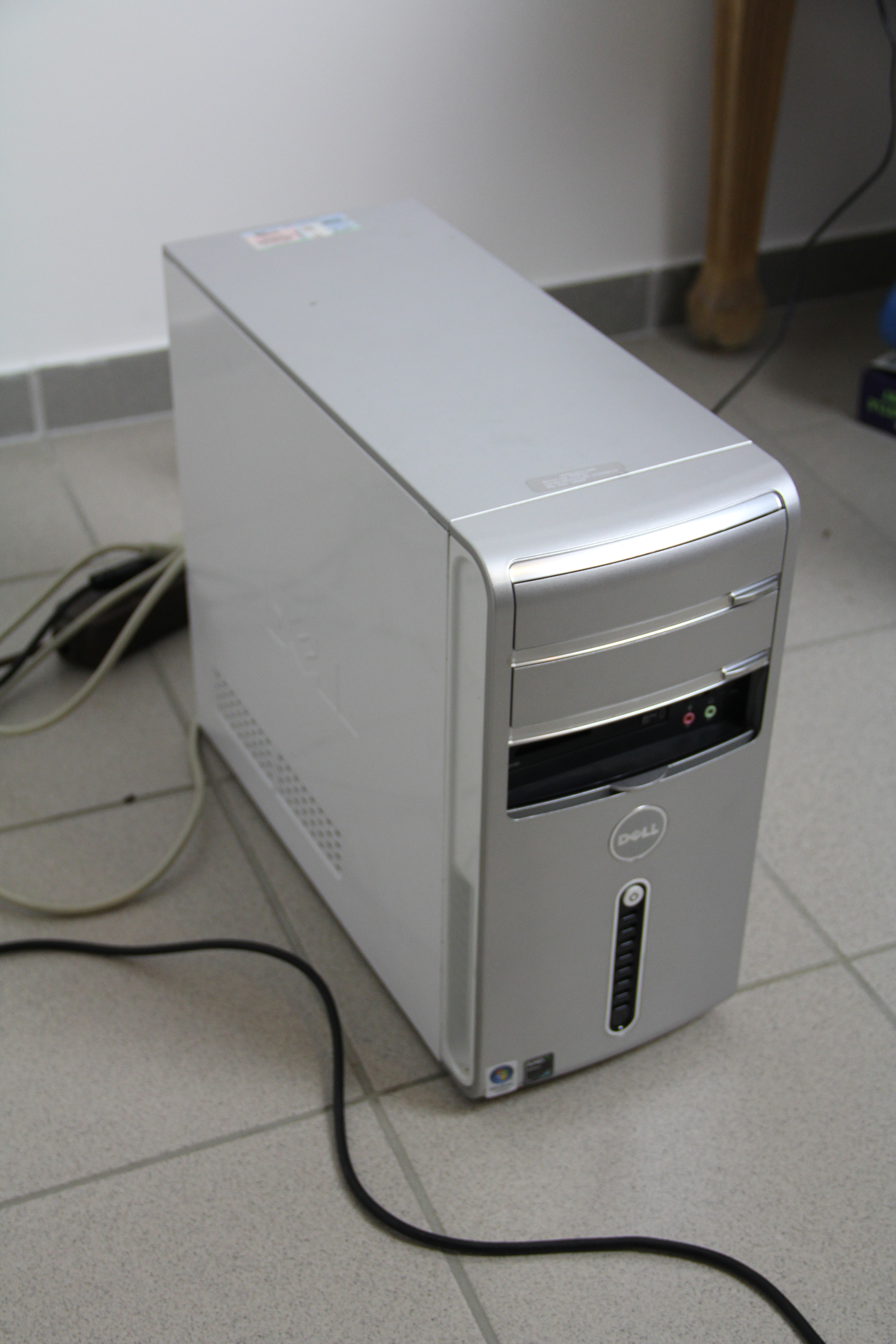
- Dell Inspiron 530
- Developer: Dell
- Manufacturer: Dell
- Product family: Inspiron
- Type: Desktop or SFF
- Released: 2007
- Discontinued: 2025
- Operating system: Windows
- CPU: Intel, AMD, ARM, Qualcomm
- Graphics: Intel/AMD/Qualcomm (integrated); ATI/AMD/Nvidia/Intel (discrete)
- Marketing target: Consumer
- Predecessor: Dimension
- Successor: Dell
- Related: Vostro, Latitude, XPS
- Website: Dell Inspiron

Dell Inspiron desktops are a discontinued line of desktop computer made by American company Dell under the Dell Inspiron branding. They were first released on June 26, 2007 as a replacement to the Dell Dimension desktop computers.

== Inspiron Zino 300 ==
Inspiron Zino 300 is part of new Inspiron desktop series.

== Inspiron Zino HD 400 ==
Launched online on November 12, 2009, the Inspiron 400, more commonly known as the Inspiron Zino HD, is an Ultra Small Form Factor desktop like the Studio Hybrid. It is in an 8" by 8" form factor and has a similar form factor to the Mac Mini and computers made by Shuttle. There are several customer reports about devices tending to overheat and shutting down randomly.

- Processors: AMD Athlon 64 2650e, 2680e or AMD Athlon 64 X2 3250e or 6850e.
- Memory: 2 GB, 3 GB, 4 GB, 6 GB, 8 GB, 32 MB of shared dual channel DDR2 SDRAM @ 800 MHz.
- Chipset: AMD RS780G.
- Graphics Processor: integrated ATI 3200 graphics or ATI Radeon HD 4330 with 512 MB of graphics memory.
- Hard Drive: 250 GB, 320 GB, 500 GB, 640 GB, 750 GB or 1 TB SATA at 7200 RPM.
- Optical Drive: 8X dual-layer DVD+/-RW drive or 2X Blu-ray Disc Combo drive.
- Wi-Fi Card: optional Dell 1397 802.11 b/g Wireless Card or Dell 1520 802.11 a/b/g/n Wireless Card.
- I/O ports: 4 USB 2.0 ports, 2 eSATA ports, 1 headphone jack, 1 microphone jack, 1 line-out connector, 1 Gigabit Ethernet port, 1 VGA output and 1 HDMI output.

== Inspiron Zino HD 410 ==
Inspiron Zino HD 410 is a party of Inspiron series.

== Inspiron 518 ==
The Dell Inspiron 518 and Dell Inspiron 519 are similar machines with the main difference being that the Dell Inspiron 518 uses Intel central processing units while the Dell Inspiron 519 uses AMD central processing units. The Dell Inspiron 518 supports Intel Core 2 Quad, Intel Core 2 Duo, Intel Pentium Dual-Core and Intel Celeron processors. The Dell Inspiron 519 supports AMD Athlon 64/ LE/ 64 X2/ X2 BE and AMD Phenom X2/ X4/ X2 GE/ triple core. and Inspiron 519

Both computers feature 2 USB 2.0 connectors on top of the computer. On the front, there is an optical-drive panel, optional optical-drive bay, 2 USB 2.0 connectors, headphone and microphone connector, drive activity light, power button and a FlexBay drive where a card reader can be installed.

The inputs and outputs at the back consisted of an IEEE 1394 connector, network adapter connector which is an RJ-45 port that supports 10/100/1000 Mbit/s speeds, 4 USB 2.0 connectors, center/subwoofer connector, line-in connector, front left/right line-out connector, microphone jack, side left/right surround connector, back left/right surround connector and VGA video connector as well as a link integrity light and a network activity light.

The power supply used for both the Dell Inspiron 518 and Dell Inspiron 519 is a 300w unit.

Physically, the Dell Inspiron 518 and Dell Inspiron 519 are 379 (14.9 inches) in height, 17.0 cm (6.7 inches) in width, 43.5 cm (17.1 inches) in depth and 13.1 kg (28.9 lb) in weight.

The motherboard or system board used in the Dell Insprion 518 and Dell Inspiron 519 both have 24 pin ATX power, 4 pin CPU power, 4 DDR2 memory module connector, PCI connector, 2 PCI Express x1 connector, a PCI Express x16 connector, and 4 SATA connectors.

== Inspiron 530 ==
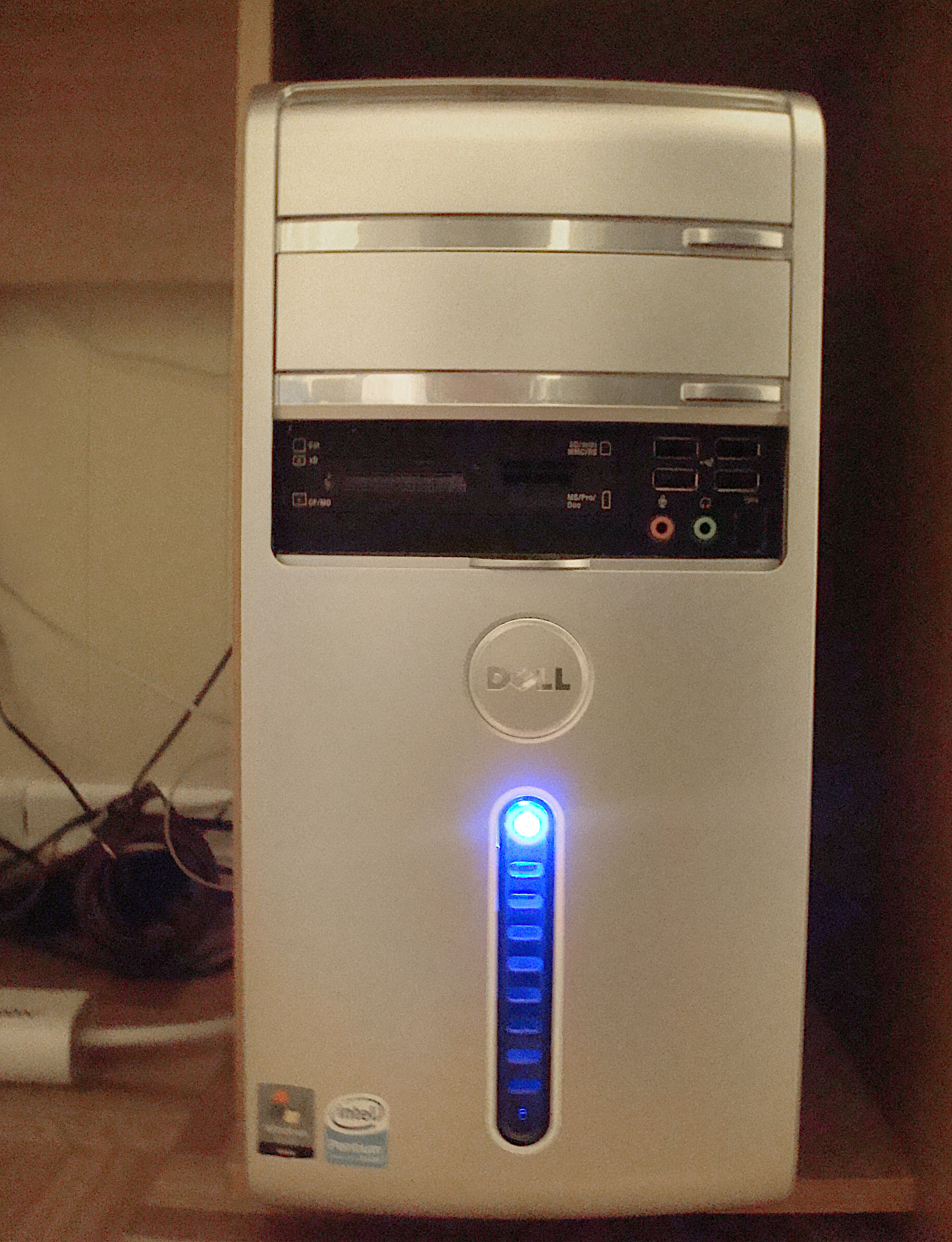
A Dell Inspiron 530.

Released on June 26, 2007, the Dell Inspiron 530 is Dell's first desktop to use the Inspiron name. The Inspiron 530 has an Intel Celeron 450, and can be customized up to an Intel Core 2 Quad Q9550. It has 2 GB of DDR2 SDRAM at 800 MHz, which can be upgraded up to 4 GB (standard bios) or 8 GB (BIOS upgrade 1.0.18 needed). The desktop has a 320 GB 7200 RPM Serial ATA hard drive w/DataBurst Cache, which can be upgraded to 1 TB. There are also data recovery versions of the 320 and 500 GB hard drive sizes. The Inspiron 530 is customizable with a variety of DVD+/-RW and Blu-ray Disc drives. The Inspiron 530 has integrated Intel GMA 3100, and can be customized up to an ATI Radeon HD 4670 discrete graphics card. It has integrated 7.1 channel audio and can be customized up to a Sound Blaster X-Fi XtremeGamer sound card. The Inspiron 530 has no initial Wi-Fi card, but can be customized up to a Dell 1505 Wireless-N PCI-e card. The Inspiron 530 has two variants of motherboards, both made by Foxconn and based on the G33M series. The G33M02 which supports up to Core 2 Duo processors (the e8600 is the fastest compatible cpu) and the DG33M03, which supports up to Core 2 Quad processors. Inspiron 530 systems sold with Pentium Dual-Core or Core 2 Duo processors can not be upgraded to a standard Core 2 Quad processor without adding at least a 350W power supply and swapping motherboards to the DG33M03 motherboard, but unofficially, an "S" series Intel Core 2 Quad Processor (A true Quad Core with a TDP of 65W) can/will work in the G33M02 Motherboard which the Celeron/Pentium-Dual Core/Core 2 Duo variant of the Inspiron 530 shipped with. The reason the G33M02 doesn't support standard Core 2 Quad processors is because it only has 6 voltage regulator ICs, the DG33M03 has 11, which is the reason of it supporting all the CPU's the Core 2 Quad and the Celeron/Pentium-Dual Core/Core 2 Duo variant of the Inspiron 530 shipped with (and other CPU's in the family of CPU's the Inspiron 530 shipped with).

== Inspiron 530s ==
The Inspiron 530s has the same design as the 530, but it is 41% slimmer. However, because of its design, it is not physically compatible with all desktop hardware, especially graphics cards (Dell only gives you the option of the ATI 2400 XT, which is not a high-performance card). The case used in the 530s can accommodate one 5.25" optical drive, one external 3.5" drive (either a 1.44 MB floppy or 19-in-1 card reader), and up to two standard 3.5" hard drives. The motherboard used in the 530s is the same as the motherboard used in the 530 edition, except for the fact that this motherboard only supports Dual-Core processors, and not any members of the Standard Quad-Core series like its twin, unless the motherboard is swapped to the DG33M03 motherboard used in the Inspiron 530, or a 65W TDP Core 2 Quad. While almost any low profile PCI-E x16 video card will physically fit in the 530s, the custom-sized Delta 250W power supply that the 530s is equipped with may seriously limit the potential for using higher-end cards, except if it is used in a different Standard ATX Case (Mid tower and Full tower), then it is as capable as a 530 is (2ith the exception of the Case features in the standard 530).

== Inspiron 531/531s ==
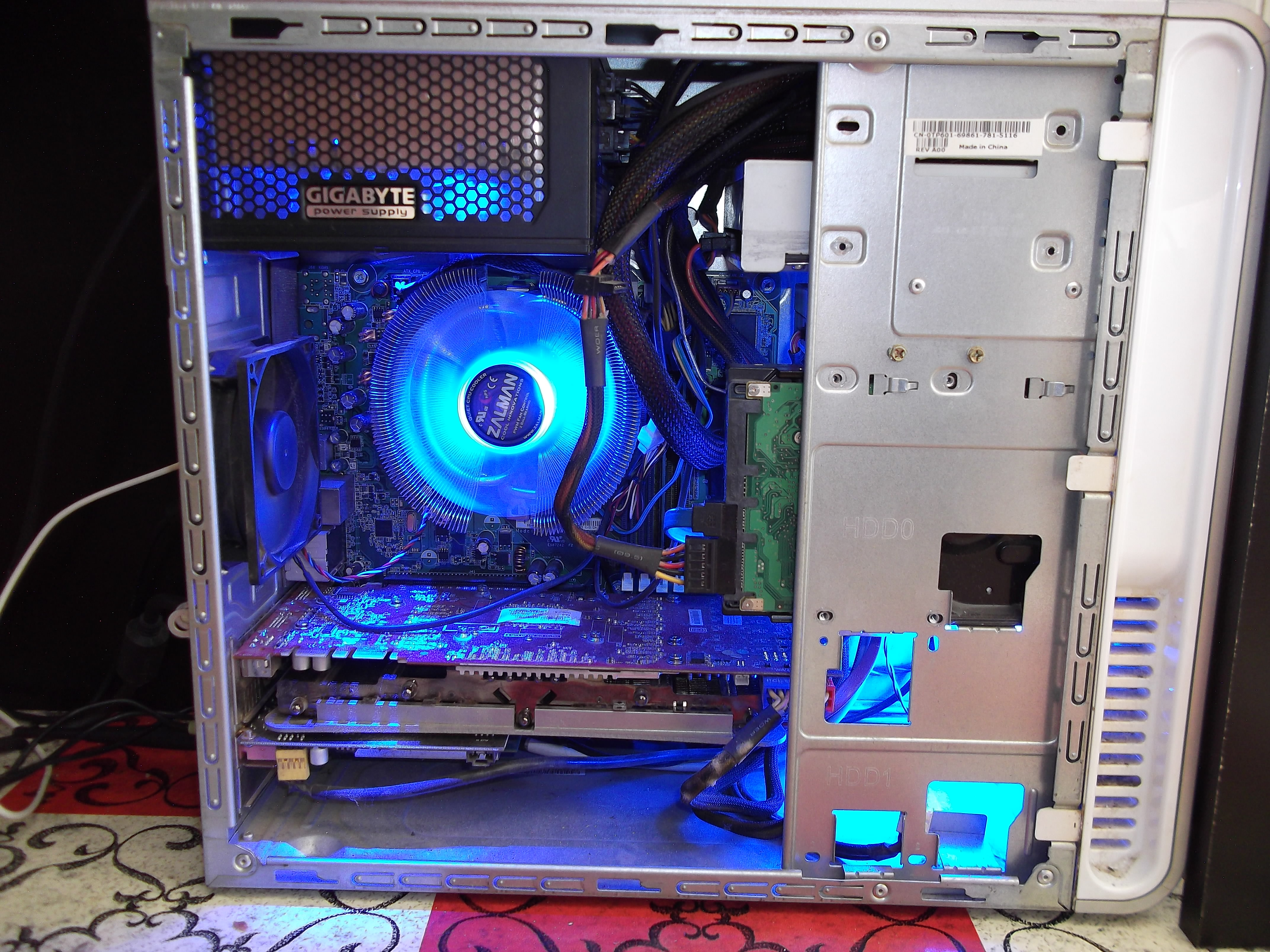
Dell Inspiron 531 upgraded for gaming purposes.

The Dell Inspiron 531 is Dell's AMD desktop counterpart to the Inspiron 530, and with exception of the CPU and motherboard, is virtually identical. Starting with the Athlon 64 X2 3800+ it can be customized up to an AMD Athlon 64 X2 6000+. The Athlon X2 7000, Phenom, Phenom II and Athlon II series are not supported. It uses 1 GB of DDR2 SDRAM at 667 MHz, which can be upgraded up to 8 GB 800 MHz under JEDEC DDR2 voltage specification. The model features the M2N61-AX OEM motherboard made by ASUS and uses nVidia GeForce 6150 integrated graphics with the nForce 430i chipset, and has two PCI slots, one PCI-e X1 and one PCI-e X16 1.0a slot. Due to the arrangement of the expansion slots, however, use of a double height video card renders the PCI-e X1 slot useless. The motherboard also features four SATA 1.0 Ports, one EIDE (floppy) plug, three USB plugs for front USB, a Firewire plug, and a front audio plug. Cooling is somewhat limited, as the motherboard only provides one 4-pin PWM CPU fan plug, and one 3-pin rear fan plug. Installation of a fan controller will be required to use additional fans. Recently, the 6.05 version of nVidia's System Performance Tools allows minor FSB overclocking, but does not allow voltage or multiplier adjustments, limiting overclocking potential. The case is Micro-ATX sized, lightweight aluminum and features one 92 mm Rear fan, one external 3 1/2" drive bay, two 5 1/4" bays and two vertical 3 1/2" internal drive bays. It also features a standard ATX sized 300 watt power supply with four SATA plugs, one 24-pin ATX12V 2.0 plug and one 4-pin P4 plug, oddly excluding any standard 4-pin Molex connectors. The I/O Shield is also part of the case, preventing the installation of third-party motherboards without modifications to the case.

== Inspiron 537 ==
Released on Dell's website on May 12, 2009, the Inspiron 537 is a mini-tower desktop that replaces the Inspiron 530. The desktop has a black chassis, but the front shell can be customized with one of eight colors. Oddly, this model was replaced by the Inspiron 546, which uses AMD processors, after being available online for less than one month.

- Processors: Intel Celeron 450, Intel Celeron Dual-Core, Intel Pentium Dual-Core E5200, Intel Core 2 Duo E5300, E7500 or E8400 or Intel Core 2 Quad Q8200 or Q9400.
- Memory: 2 GB, 3 GB, or 4 GB of shared dual channel DDR2 SDRAM @ 800 MHz (upgradeable to 8 GB).
- Chipset: Intel G41 Express Chipset.
- Graphics Processor: integrated Intel GMA X4500 graphics or ATI Radeon HD 4350 with 512 MB of graphics memory.
- Hard Drive: 320 GB, or 500 GB SATA at 7200 RPM.
- Optical Drive: 8X dual-layer DVD+/-RW drive or 2X Blu-ray Disc Combo drive.
- Wi-Fi Card: Dell Wireless 1505 802.11n mini-card with external antenna.
- I/O ports: 4 USB 2.0 ports, 1 FireWire port (optional), 1 Fast Ethernet port, 1 56K modem (optional), 1 VGA output, 1 HDMI output (with ATI Radeon HD 4350), 1 headphone jack, 2 microphone jacks, 1 line-in connector, 1 line-out connector, 1 19-in-1 memory card reader (optional), and 1 power cable connector.

== Inspiron 537s ==
The Inspiron 537s is simply the slim version of the Inspiron 537 with similar features. It replaces the Inspiron 530s. The Inspiron 537s is limited to an Intel Core 2 Quad Q8200, whereas the Inspiron 537 can be customized with up to a Core 2 Quad Q9400. Because of its slim form factor, it only has one optical drive. The other hardware configuration options are identical to those of the Inspiron 537. The memory is only upgradeable to 4 GB.

- Processors: Intel Celeron 450, Intel Celeron Dual-Core E5100, Intel Pentium Dual-Core E5200, Intel Core 2 Duo E5300, E7500 or E8400 or Intel Core 2 Quad Q8200.
- Memory: 2 GB, 3 GB, or 4 GB of shared dual channel DDR2 SDRAM @ 800 MHz.
- Chipset: Intel G41 Express Chipset.
- Graphics Processor: integrated Intel GMA X4500 graphics or ATI Radeon HD 4350 with 512 MB of graphics memory.
- Hard Drive: 640 GB SATA at 7200 RPM.
- Optical Drive: 8X dual-layer DVD+/-RW drive or 2X Blu-ray Disc Combo drive.
- Wi-Fi Card: Dell Wireless 1505 802.11n mini-card with external antenna.
- I/O ports: 4 USB 2.0 ports, 1 FireWire port (optional), 1 Fast Ethernet port, 1 56K modem (optional), 1 VGA output, 1 HDMI output (with ATI Radeon HD 4350), 1 headphone jack, 2 microphone jacks, 1 line-in connector, 1 line-out connector, 1 19-in-1 memory card reader (optional), and 1 power cable connector.

== Inspiron 545 ==
The Inspiron 545 is a non-configurable mini-tower desktop that only retails at Best Buy and the Dell Outlet.

- Processors: Intel Core 2 Duo E7400, or Core 2 Quad Q8300, Q9300, or Q9400
- Memory: 2 GB, 3 GB, 4 GB, 6 GB, or 8 GB of shared dual channel DDR2 SDRAM @ 800 MHz.
- Chipset: Intel G31 Express Chipset.
- Graphics Processor: integrated Intel GMA 3100 graphics, ATI Radeon HD 4350 or Nvidia GeForce GT220.
- Hard Drive: 750 GB or 1 TB SATA at 7200 RPM.
- Optical Drive: 8X dual-layer DVD+/-RW drive.
- Wi-Fi Card: Dell Wireless 1505 802.11n mini-card with external antenna. (no card in Australia)
- I/O ports: 6 USB 2.0 ports, 1 Fast Ethernet port, 1 56K modem, 1 VGA output, 1 HDMI output, 1 19-in-1 memory card reader, 1 headphone jack, 2 microphone jacks, 1 line-in connector, 1 line-out connector and 1 power cable connector.

== Inspiron 545s ==
The Inspiron 545s is the slimmer version of the Inspiron 545. Like its mini-tower cousin, the Inspiron 545s is non-configurable and only retails at Best Buy and the Dell Outlet.

- Processors: Intel Core 2 Duo E7400.
- Memory: 2 GB, 3 GB, 4 GB, or 6 GB of shared dual channel DDR2 SDRAM @ 800 MHz.
- Chipset: Intel G33 Express chipset.
- Graphics Processor: integrated Intel GMA 3100 graphics or ATI Radeon HD 4350 or a Nvidia GT 220.
- Hard drive: 250 GB, 500 GB or 750 GB SATA at 7200 RPM.
- Optical drive: 8× dual-layer DVD+/-RW drive.
- Wi-Fi card: none.
- I/O ports: six USB 2.0 ports, one Fast Ethernet port, one 56K modem, one VGA output, one headphone jack, two microphone jacks, one line-in connector, one line-out connector and one power cable connector.

== Inspiron 546 ==
This model quietly went on sale on Dell's website and replaced the Inspiron 537. It features AMD processors.

- Processors: AMD Sempron LE-1300, AMD Athlon LE-1660, AMD Athlon X2 7550, AMD Phenom X3 8650 or 8750, or AMD Phenom X4 9750.
- Memory: 2 GB, 3 GB, 4 GB, 6 GB, or 8 GB of shared dual channel DDR2 SDRAM @ 800 MHz.
- Chipset: AMD 780G chipset
- Graphics Processor: integrated ATI Radeon 3200 graphics, ATI Radeon HD 3450, HD 4350, or nVidia GeForce GT 220.
- Hard Drive: 320 GB, 500 GB, 640 GB, 750 GB, or 1 TB SATA at 7200 RPM or 640 GB, 750 GB, or 1 TB SATA @ 7200 RPM w/DataSafe.
- Optical Drive: 16X dual-layer DVD+/-RW drive, 2X Blu-ray Disc Combo drive, or Blu-ray Disc Burner.
- Wi-Fi Card: Dell Wireless 1505 802.11n mini-card with external antenna.
- I/O ports: 4 USB 2.0 ports, 1 FireWire port (optional), 1 Fast Ethernet port, 1 56K modem (optional), 1 VGA output, 1 HDMI output (with ATI Radeon HD 4350), 1 headphone jack, 2 microphone jacks, 1 line-in connector, 1 line-out connector, 1 19-in-1 memory card reader (optional), and 1 power cable connector.

== Inspiron 560 and Inspiron 570 ==
The Dell Inspiron 560 and Dell Inspiron 570 are similar machines with the main difference being that the Dell Inspiron 560 uses Intel central processing units while the Dell Inspiron 570 uses AMD central processing units. The Dell Inspiron 560 supports Intel Core 2 Quad, Intel Core 2 Duo, Intel Pentium Dual-Core and Intel Celeron processors. The Dell Inspiron 570 supports AMD Sempron, AMD Athlon II X2/X3/X4 and AMD Phenom™ II X2/X3/X4 processors. The Dell Inspiron 560 uses Intel G43 chipset and Intel GMA X4500 integrated graphics while the Dell Inspiron 570 uses AMD 785G chipset and ATI Radeon HD 4200 integrated graphics.

Both Dell Inspiron 560 and Inspiron 570 feature four internally-accessible DDR3 DIMM sockets. Also both Dell Inspiron 560 and Inspiron 570 uses 300w power supplies and a 3-V CR2032 lithium coin-cell battery.

Physically, the Dell Inspiron 560 and Dell Inspiron 570 are 375.92 mm (14.80 inches) in height, 176.02 mm (6.93 inches) in width, 442.98 mm (17.44 inches) in depth, and 7.9 kg (17.4 lb) in weight.

The motherboard or system board used in the Dell Insprion 560 and Dell Inspiron 570 both have 24 pin ATX power, 4 pin CPU power, 4 DDR3 memory module connector, PCI connector, 2 PCI Express x1 connector, a PCI Express x16 connector and 4 SATA connectors.

The inputs and outputs at the back consisted of a network adapter connector which is an RJ-45 port that supports 10/100/1000 Mbit/s speeds, 4 USB 2.0 connectors, center/subwoofer connector, line-in connector, front left/right line-out connector, microphone jack, side left/right surround connector, rear left/right surround connector and a network activity light. The Inspiron 560 only had a VGA connector, but however, the Inspiron 570 has an additional HDMI connector alongside with the VGA one.

== Inspiron 580 ==
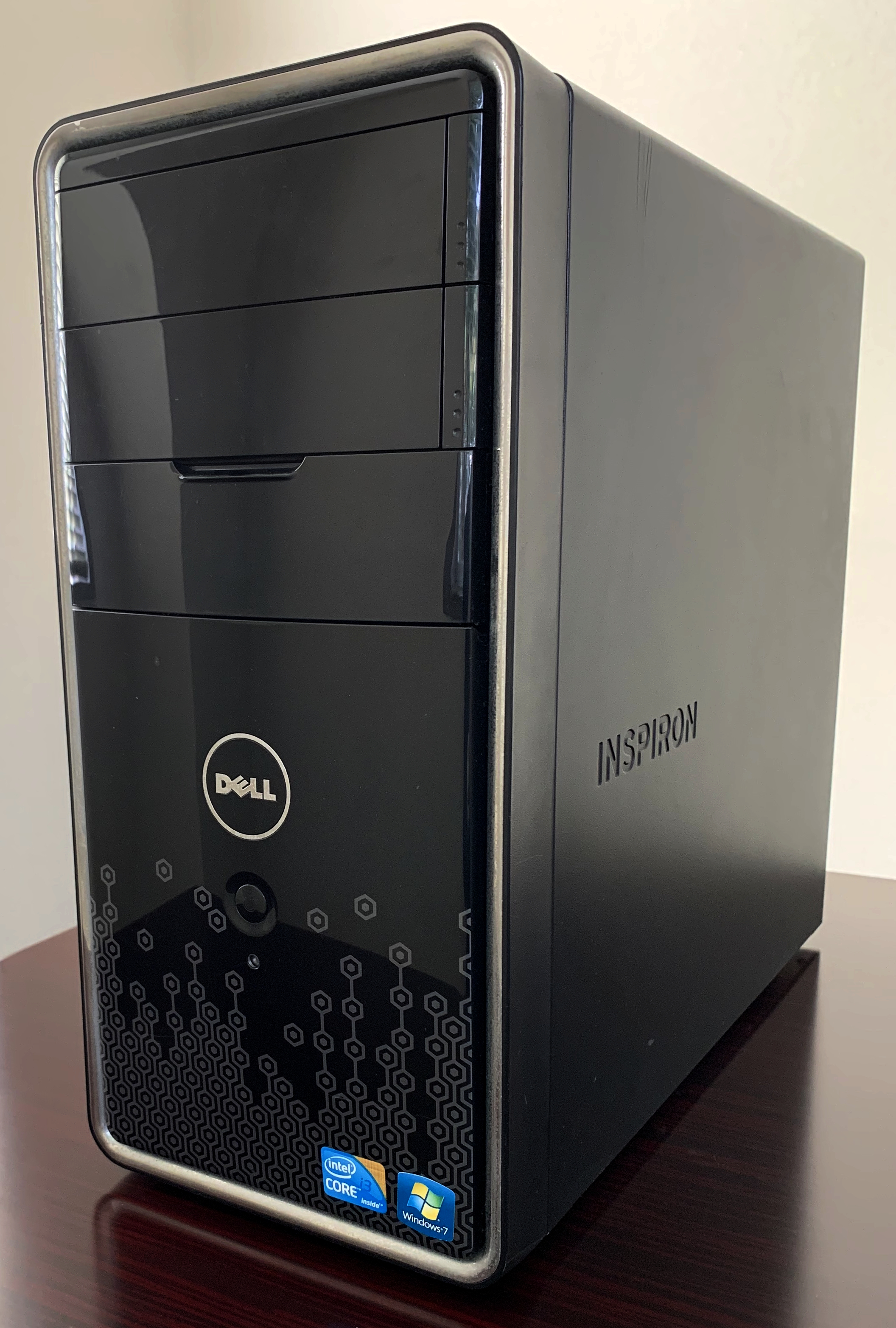
Inspiron 580

The Dell Inspiron 580 and Dell Inspiron 580s offer similar configurations with the main difference being that the Dell Inspiron 580s uses a slim form factor case where the 580 is a tower, and Inspiron 580s.

The motherboard used in both models is based around the Intel H57 chipset, and uses Intel Core i3, Intel Core i5, and Intel Pentium processors. The motherboard features four internally-accessible DDR3 DIMM sockets. The system board connectors consists of four 240-pin connectors for memory, one 124-pin for PCI, two 36-pin connectors for PCI Express x1, one 164-pin connector for PCI Express x16, one 24-pin EPS 12V connector (ATX-compatible) for power, one 4-pin connector for the processor fan, one 3-pin connector for the chassis fan, two 9-pin connectors for front/internal USB connector, one 9-pin connector for 2-channel stereo sound and microphone for the front audio connector, and four 7-pin connectors for SATA. Both computers uses 3-V CR2032 lithium coin-cell battery.

The back panel connectors for both the Dell Inspiron 580 and Dell Inspiron 580s consists off a HDMI connector, a VGA connector, 4 USB 2.0 connectors, rear left/right surround connector, side left/right surround connector, microphone connector, front left/right line-out connector, line-in connector, center/subwoofer connector and a network connector with light.

Both the Dell Inspiron 580 and Dell Inspiron 580s have one 5.25-inch bay for an optical drive, one 3.5-inch FlexBay for an optional Media Card Reader and two 3.5-inch bays for SATA hard drives that are internally accessible.

The Dell Inspiron 580 uses a 300W power supply while the Dell Inspiron 580s uses a 250w power supply.

Physically, the Dell Inspiron 580 is 375.92 mm (14.80 inches) in height, 176.02 mm (6.93 inches) in width, 442.98 mm (17.44 inches) in depth, and 7.9 kg (17.4 lb) in weight and physically, the Dell Inspiron 580s is 375.3 mm (14.77 inches) in height, 175.9 mm (6.92 inches) in width, 440.4 mm (17.34 inches) in depth, and 8.7 kg (19.2 lb) in weight.

== Inspiron 620 and Inspiron 620s ==
The Dell Inspiron 620 and Inspiron 620s are pre-built desktop computers manufactured by Dell. Both units come with second-generation Intel Core i3 and i5 processors. The units also come with Windows 7 Home Basic and Windows 7 Home Premium operating systems.

== Inspiron 660 ==
The Dell Inspiron 660 is a pre-built desktop PC manufactured by Dell in around 2012 or 2013.

Physically, the Dell Inspiron 660 is 367.74 mm in height, 175 mm in width, 439.5 mm in depth, and 7.9 kg in weight. The PC comes in with Intel Core i3 and i5 processors just like the Inspiron 620 and it also come in with Intel Pentium and Intel Celeron. They also come in on 2 or 4 GB of DDR3 RAM in which can be upgraded to 8 GB of RAM in speeds 1333 or 1600 MHz.

== Inspiron Micro Desktop (3050) ==
Source:

== Inspiron Small Desktop (3252) ==
Source:

== Inspiron Desktop (Intel) (3650) ==
Source:

== Inspiron Desktop (AMD) (3656) ==
Source:

== Inspiron 3668 ==
The Dell Inspiron Desktop (Intel) (3668) features a power button, 5-in-1 multi-card reader, audio combo jack, 2 USB 3.0 ports, an optical drive and an air vent on the front of the computer. At the back of the computer there is line in/out & mic, VGA, HDMI, 4 USB 2.0 ports, Ethernet port, security-cable slot and padlock rings.

The 5-in-1 multi-card reader supports SD card, SD High Capacity (SDHC) card, SD Extended Capacity (SDXC) card, MultiMediaCard (MMC) and MultiMediaCard Plus (MMC Plus).

The motherboard uses the Intel H110 chipset and supports Intel Core i3, Intel Core i5, Intel Core i7, Intel Celeron and Intel Pentium processors. The motherboard has 2 DDR4 U-DIMM memory-module slots, 2 PCI Express x1 connector, 1 PCI Express x16 connector, 4 SATA connector, 4 pin CPU power connector and 6 pin motherboard power connector.

The audio controller used is the Realtek ALC3820.

Physically, the Dell Inspiron (Intel) (3668) is 352.90 mm (13.90 inches) in height, 154 mm (6.06 inches) in width, 303 mm (11.93 inches) in depth and 5.90 kg (13.01 lb) in weight.

== Inspiron 3880, 3881, and 3891 ==
The 2020 Dell Inspiron 3880, 3881, and 3891 offer similar configurations, which the 3880 and 3881 models support 10th gen Intel Celeron, Pentium, and Core i3/i5/i7. On the front of the PC there were 2 USB 2.0 ports and 2 USB 3.2 ports, as well as an SD card reader and a headphone jack. There were air vents on the left side cover and on the front of the computer, and on the back there is a VGA, HDMI 1.4b, 2 USB 2.0 ports, 2 USB 3.2 ports, a line out port, an Ethernet port, security-cable slot and padlock rings. It includes two DDR4-2666/2933 slots holding a maximum of 64 GB, one M.2 SSD, and 1 3.5 inch hard drive. These PCs include WiFi and Bluetooth, and options for 200- or 260-watt power supply. These power supplies only handle up to Nvidia GeForce GT 1030, but it's possible to put an Nvidia GeForce 1650 in this PC.

Dell Inspiron 3891 is newer than 3880 and 3881, with support for 11th gen Intel Core i5/i7, as well as 10th gen Intel CPUs. There were similar specs, but the 3891 has two USB 2.0 ports, one USB 3.2 ports, and one USB-C port, which the Dell Inspiron 3880 and 3881 lacked.

The F versions of 10th and 11th gen Intel CPUs doesn't have VGA or HDMI ports and requires a low-end Nvidia GPU to run like the GT 1030.

== Inspiron Gaming Desktop (5675) ==
Offered with AMD Ryzen 7 1700X, 5 1600X, 5 1400, 3, 7th Generation AMD A10-9700 or AMD A12-9800 quad core APU with Radeon R7 Graphics and AMD RX 560 or AMD RX 570, RX 580 or Nvidia GeForce GTX 1060 dedicated graphics.

== Inspiron 3020 and 3030 ==
The 2023 and 2024 Dell Inspiron 3020 and 3030 has a 13th and 14th generation Intel Core processors and runs Windows 11. It also has an HDMI port, 1TB of storage, and Intel Graphics, lacking the use of a VGA port.
