= Dell Inspiron All-in-One =

Line of Dell computers

Dell Inspiron All-in-Ones
- Dell Inspiron logo

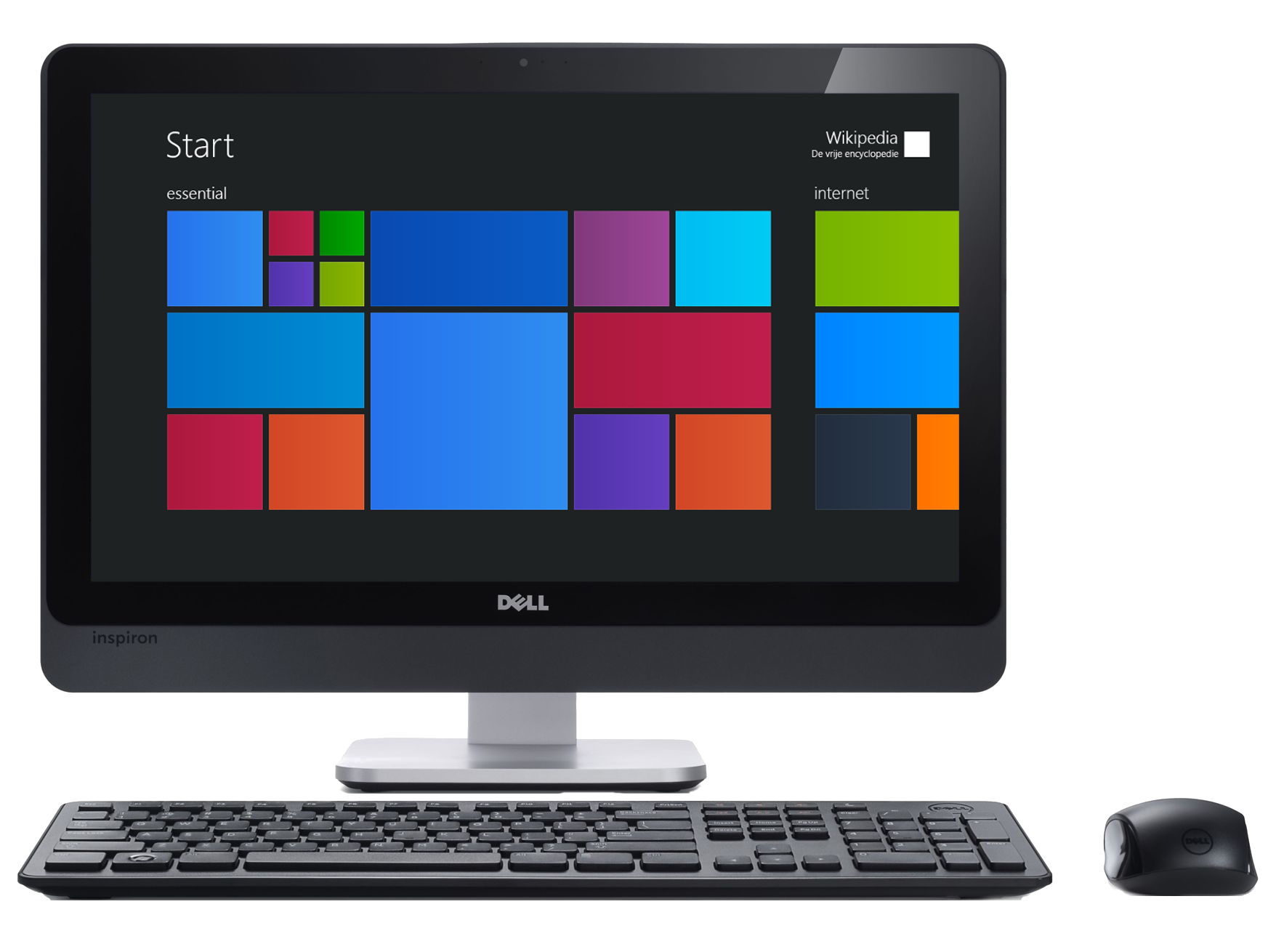
- Inspiron One 23 Touch
- Developer: Dell
- Manufacturer: Dell
- Product family: Inspiron
- Type: All-in-one
- Released: 2011
- Discontinued: 2025
- CPU: AMD Ryzen, Intel Celeron, Intel Pentium, Intel Core i3, Intel Core i5, Intel Core i7
- Graphics: Intel HD, ATI/AMD Radeon, NVIDIA GeForce
- Successor: Dell
- Related: Vostro, Latitude, XPS
- Website: Dell Inspiron

This is a list of Dell Inspiron All-in-One computers.

== Ones ==
=== List of Dell Inspiron Ones ===
- Insprion One 19
- Inspiron One 19 Touch
- Inspiron One 2020
- Inspiron One 2205
- Inspiron One 2305
- Inspiron One 2310
- Inspiron One 2320
- Inspiron One 2330

=== Spec comparison ===
Model	Released	Chipset	CPU	RAM type	RAM speed	RAM Max	Height	Width	Depth	Display	USB
19/ 19 Touch											
2020		Intel H61 Express	Intel Celetron Dual Core or Pentium Dual Core or 3rd generation Core i3 or i5	non-ECC DDR3 SO-DIMM	up to 1600 MHz	up to 8 GB	376.9 mm (14.8 inches)	506.8 mm (20.0 inches)	Edge (touch) - 35.0 mm (1.4 inches) Chassis (touch) - 65.5 mm (2.6 inches) Edge (non-touch) - 34.5 mm (1.4 inches) Chassis (non-touch) - 63.2 mm (2.5 inches)	20.2" full HD (1920 x 1080) WLED	5x USB 2.0
2205											
2305											
2310											
2320		Intel H61 Express	Intel Pentium Dual Core or Core i3 or Core i5 or Core i7	non-ECC DDR3 SO-DIMM	1333 MHz	up to 8 GB	430 mm (16.93 inches)	568.00 mm (22.36 inches)	Touchscreen - 79.00 mm (3.11 inches) Non-touchscreen - 75.50 mm (2.97 inches)	23" full HD (1920 x 1080) WLED	6x USB 2.0
2330		Intel B75 Express	Intel Core i3 (2nd generation) or Core i5 (2nd or 3rd generation) or Core i7 (3rd generation) maximum TDP 65 watts	non-ECC DDR3 SO-DIMM	up to 1600 MHz	up to 16 GB	442.40 mm (17.40 inches)	574.0 mm (22.60 inches)	With Stand - 220.0 mm (8.66 inches)	23" full HD (1920 x 1080) WLED at 60 Hz	4x USB 3.0 and 2x USB 2.0
Model	Released	Chipset	CPU	RAM type	RAM speed	RAM Max				PCI / PCIe	USB

== 3000 Series ==
Inspiron 20 3000 All-in-One Desktop (3043)

Inspiron 20 3000 All-in-One (3052)

Inspiron 20 3000 All-in-One (3059)

Inspiron 20 3000 All-in-One (3064). Features 7th Generation Intel Core i3-7100U processor, 4GB of memory, a 1TB 5400rpm hard drive and Intel HD Graphics 620 with shared graphics memory.

Inspiron 24 3000 All-in-One (3459)

Inspiron 24 3000 All-in-One (AMD) (3455)

== 5000 Series ==
Inspiron 24 5000 All-in-One (5459)

Inspiron 24 5000 All-in-One (5415)

== 7000 Series ==
Inspiron 23 7000 All-in-One Touch Screen Desktop (2350)

Inspiron 24 7000 All-in-One (7459)
