= Core product =

Company's primary promotion, service or product

A core product is a company's primary promotion, service or product that can be purchased by a consumer. Core products may be integrated into end products, either by the company producing the core product or by other companies to which the core product is sold.

== Three levels of a product ==
The concept of a core product originates from Philip Kotler, in his 1967 book – Marketing Management: Analysis, Planning and Control. It forms the first level of the concept of Three Levels of a Product.

Kotler suggested that products can be divided into three levels: core product, actual product and augmented product. The core product is defined as the benefit that the product brings to the customer. The actual product refers to the tangible object and relates to the physical quality and the design. The augmented product consists of the measures taken to help the consumer put the actual product to use. By using a mixture of the three levels of product in research and development, business firms can better understand their customers, better position themselves in the market and create a more successful product.

== New product development ==
The new product development (NPD) process, often referred to as the Stage-Gate innovation process, was developed by Dr. Robert G. Cooper as a result of comprehensive research on reasons why products succeed or fail. The process initially focuses on idea generation that defines the core product. If the core product is innovative and addresses market demand, it can lead to successful actual products.

== Marketing strategy ==
=== Product issues ===
One marketing strategy emphasizes product issues. In a competitive market, product-based success requires that customers obtain significant value from the core product.

=== Product marketing ===
Product marketing is the process of promoting and selling a product to an audience. It further includes defining the scope of the product line, identifying potential markets for a product and determining optimal pricing. Product Marketers also act as a bridge between Sales, Marketing and Product, reporting on the market's response to product launches and updates in order to refine messaging and features. As mentioned, the core product directly affects customers' interest level.

=== Meeting customers' expectations ===
A company usually does research and development (R&D) before creating a new product. In order to meet customers' needs, the core product is an important element that attracts people to buy the firm's product. International marketing research conducted by the University of Southern California found that customers and professionals usually emphasize service characteristics such as heterogeneous products (variation in standards among providers, frequently even among different locations of the same firm) and inseparability from consumption. This can show how important of having a core product is to a firm, in order to meet customer expectation. And this has to be done only by injecting money to do R&D.

=== Competition ===
The competition between businesses focuses mainly on the distinctiveness of the Augmented Product and the core product, according to Kotler. It is about consumer perceptions of purchasing a product and less about value. He states: “Competition is determined not so much by what companies produce, but by what they add to their product in the form of packaging, services, advertising, advice, delivery (financing) arrangements and other things that can be of value to consumers”. To beat the competition, product companies focus on factors to which consumers attach extra value, such as packaging, advertisements, service and payment terms. The element of surprise is key.

== Examples ==
=== Information technology ===
Core products are usually the first products that the company created and sustained itself from its founding like the BASIC for Microsoft, The Apple II computer for Apple Inc. and the Google Search platform. Therefore, emphasis is placed on the profitability of core products while working on other products, hoping that they will become a competency. Core products usually make the most profit.

Examples of core products by notable IT firms include:

- Microsoft – Windows
- Google Inc. – Google Search, Android
- Apple Inc. – macOS, iOS

The above core products are then produced as an actual product. Examples of how the core product and actual product are used together include:

- Google Inc. – Android and Google Pixel
- Apple Inc. – macOS and Macintosh, iOS and iPhone, iPadOS and iPad
- Acer – Aspire and TravelMate
- ASUS – VivoBook, Transformer and ZenBook
- Dell – Consumer, Pro, and XPS
- HP – EliteBook, OmniBook, ProBook and ZBook
- Lenovo – IdeaCentre, IdeaPad, ThinkCentre and ThinkPad
