= Dell Inspiron =

Line of laptops and desktop computers by Dell

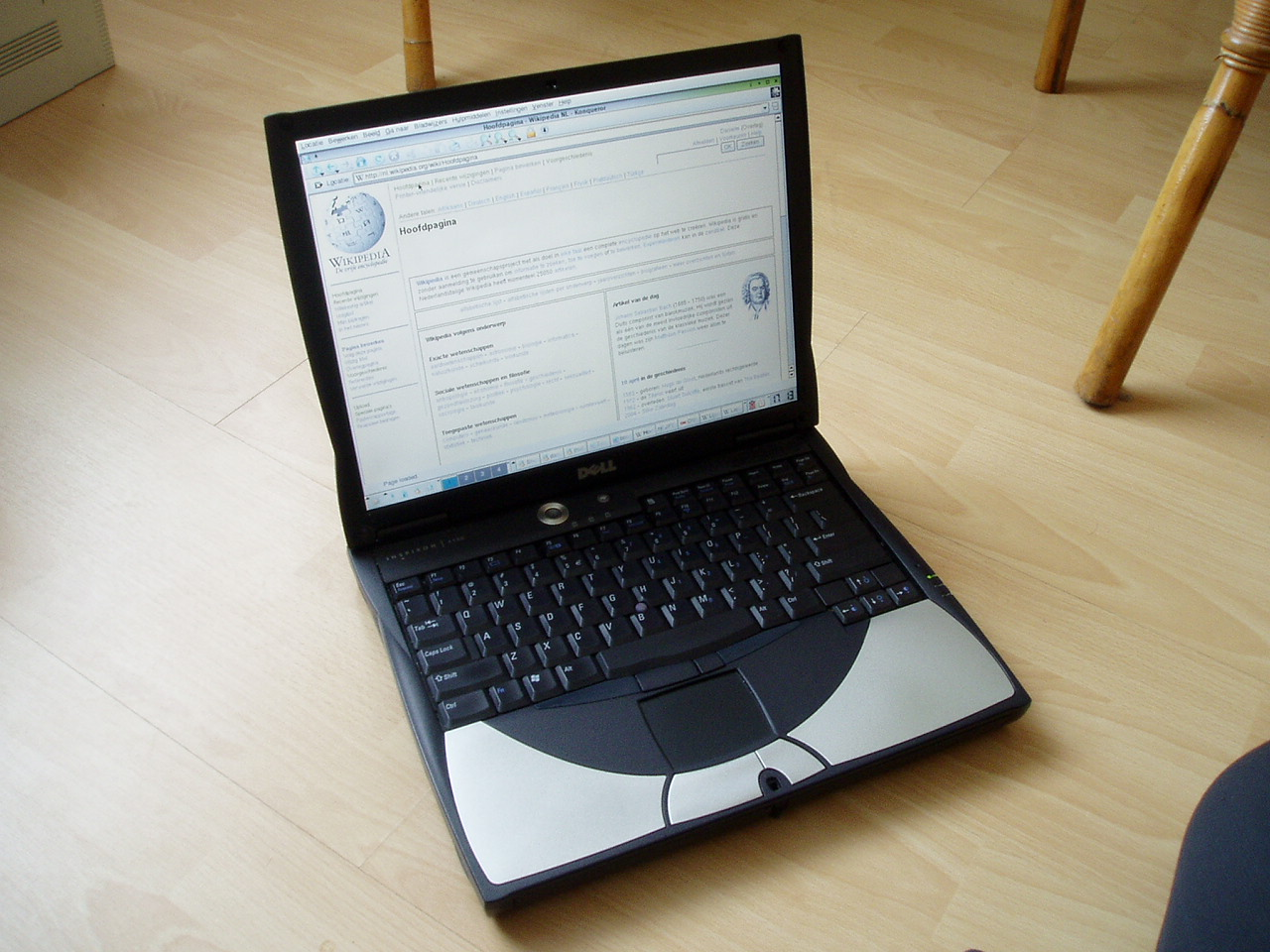
- Developer: Dell
- Manufacturer: Dell
- Type: Laptop, desktop
- Released: 1997 (laptops); 2007 (desktops)
- Discontinued: 2025
- Operating system: Windows
- CPU: Intel, AMD, ARM, Qualcomm
- Graphics: Intel/AMD/Qualcomm (integrated); ATI/AMD/Nvidia/Intel (discrete)
- Marketing target: Consumer
- Predecessor: Dimension (desktops)
- Successor: Dell
- Related: Vostro, Latitude, XPS
- Website: Dell Inspiron

Inspiron (/ˈɪnspɪrɒn/ IN-spirr-on, formerly stylized as inspiron) is a discontinued line of mid-range consumer-oriented laptops, desktops, and all-in-one personal computers sold by Dell.

The Inspiron range mainly competed against Acer's Aspire and Swift; Asus's VivoBook and ZenBook; HP's Pavilion, Stream, Envy and Spectre; Lenovo's IdeaPad and Yoga; Samsung's Galaxy Book; and Toshiba's Satellite.

In January 2025 Dell announced a major restructuring that saw the demise of the Inspiron brand, along with others. Inspiron was succeeded by Dell.

== Types ==
The Dell Inspiron lineup consisted of laptops, desktops, and all-in-one desktops.

- Dell Inspiron laptops
- Dell Inspiron desktop computers
- Dell Inspiron All-in-Ones
- Dell Inspiron Mini Series netbooks (2008-2010)

== Controversy ==
Dell was the subject of a class action lawsuit in 2005 over some of their Inspiron laptops (models affected include the 1100, 1150, 5100, 5150, and 5160). The suit was filed in September 2005, and was officially settled between December 2006 and January 2007, in what is known as the Lundell Settlement. There were a number of design flaws in this model, ranging from flaws in the cooling system of the notebook to a tab on the "C" panel pressing on the motherboard. In all, the design flaws caused the notebook to shut down suddenly or not to boot at all. The suit had been filed in Ontario, Canada; claimants said that the laptops suffered premature motherboard failures caused by overheating shortly after the warranty period had ended.

== See also ==
Dell consumer product lines:

- XPS (premium)
- Dell G Series (entry-level gaming systems)
- Alienware (high-performance gaming systems)
- Studio (mainstream)
- Adamo (high-end luxury subnotebook)

Dell business product lines:

- Vostro (office/small business)
- n Series (shipped with Linux or FreeDOS installed)
- Latitude (notebooks)
- OptiPlex (workstations)
- Precision (high performance workstations)
