= Dell (brand) =

Discussion of PC product-lines/brands Dell

Dell brand
- Company logo as of September 7, 2016
- Current owner: Dell Inc., Dell Technologies Inc.
- Country: Worldwide
- Markets: Information technology
- Website: dell.com

Dell is a brand name belonging to Dell Inc.. Once just the company name, it has subsequently been embraced as an intrinsic part of contemporary product line branding in the marketing of most of their personal computer and computer monitor products.

== Classical branding ==
=== Personal computers ===
Since the 1990s Dell Inc. sold personal computers almost exclusively under a collection of product-line brand names, utilising the concept of individual branding. Some of these brand names remained in existence for roughly three decades. As summarised below, only two remain as of 2026.

Market	Line	Began	Ended
Business	Precision	1992 (Note: As discussed in the Dell Precision article, the first use of this brand name extends back at least as far as 1992. In 1998 it was co-opted to represent their workstation line.)	2025
Business	Dimension	1993	2007
Business	OptiPlex	1993	2025
Business	Latitude	1994	2025
Business	Vostro	2007	2024
Consumer	XPS	1993 (Note: Started as part of Dimension in 1993, before becoming a full brand in its own right in 2008.)	-
Consumer	Inspiron	1997	2025
Consumer	Studio	2008	2011
Consumer	Adamo	2009	2011
Gaming	Alienware	2006 (Note: As owned by Dell. Formerly a separate company, founded in 1996.)	-
Gaming	G Series	2018	2025

=== Monitors ===
Individualized branding was also utilised for their monitor product lines, though contrastingly the naming demonstrated less creativity, largely consisting of letter-based series styling.

Product line	Market & purpose
E-Series	Essentials series, for "the casual user"
S-Series	Consumer series, for the "home-based power-user"
P-Series	Professional series
C-Series	For "collaboration and conferencing"
UltraSharp	For creativity; "best for color & performance intensive work"
Alienware	For gaming

== Rebrand of 2025 ==
2025 restructure

=== Personal computers ===
On January 6, 2025, Dell announced plans to gradually phase out most of their existing PC brands in favor of a refreshed product lineup, with an almost unilateral embrace of umbrella branding. While the Alienware brand was to remain for their gaming market, all other active brand names, including XPS, Inspiron, Latitude, and Precision were to go in favor of a new strategy revolving around unifying products under the Dell name. A stated reason for this change was because a consumer survey had found that "74% of consumers walked away from technology purchases simply because they felt overwhelmed" due to complexity.

The refreshed branding, excluding the retained Alienware, consisted of three product lines:

- Dell: "Designed for play, school and work"; aimed at consumers, supplanting the Inspiron and XPS brands,
- Dell Pro: For "professional-grade productivity"; aimed at businesses, supplanting Latitude, and
- Dell Pro Max: For "maximum performance"; supplanting Precision.

Furthermore, each line had three tiers, base (having no suffix), Plus, and Premium. This resulted in a set of nine options: Dell; Dell Plus; Dell Premium; Dell Pro; Dell Pro Plus; Dell Pro Premium; Dell Pro Max; Dell Pro Max Plus; and Dell Pro Max Premium.

The base and Plus tiers of the consumer-oriented Dell line would, more specifically, supplant Inspiron, while the Premium tier would supplant XPS. Although, one journalist claimed that it had been clarified that larger, more powerful XPS models might instead fall under Dell Pro Max Premium.

Some journalists pointed out the clear inspiration from use of such terms in the likes of Apple iPhone branding, though some also highlighted clear distinctions in Dell's use of them.

=== Monitors ===
On the same day that Dell announced its shake up of PC branding, new Dell monitors were also announced which saw additional use of this fresh branding concept. One of three new monitors announced in that press release utilised the new Dell Pro branding. The other two were announced as Dell UltraSharp, presumably re-utilising UltraSharp now as a special tier under the new Dell consumer line, though unfortunately the press announcement made no clarification of the exact details of the monitor brand structural changes.

== Rebrand of 2026 ==
2026 restructure

=== Personal computers ===
A year later, in January 2026, Dell implemented further restructuring. The tiers concept from the previous 2025 restructure was dropped; the XPS brand was revived as Dell XPS, replacing Dell Premium; and use of the Precision brand was renewed in the form of Dell Pro Precision, which supplanted Dell Pro Max.

This restructure resulted in the following much simpler set of product options:

- Alienware: Consumer gaming line
- Dell: Standard consumer line
- Dell XPS: Premium consumer line
- Dell Pro: Business line
- Dell Pro Precision: Performance business workstation line

Products released under the Dell Premium branding during 2025 could be found, in August 2026, re-branded as XPS on the Dell website. Furthermore, descriptions of all available XPS models, those from 2025 and 2026, contained no sign of the expected Dell prefix, being named in the form XPS 13 Laptop, suggesting a further rethink in how the XPS brand was to be presented, and representing a full reversal of changes relating to XPS.

=== Monitors ===
As of August 2026, Dell retains some use of the tiers concept with monitors, with the Dell website presenting their monitor product lines in their product filter as follows:

- Dell: Personal (consumer) line, with base and Plus tiers
- Dell Pro: Professional (business) line, with base, Plus, and P tiers
- Dell UltraSharp: Creative (graphics/video editing) line
- Alienware: Gaming line

A Dell blog and a Dell brochure claimed however, that the newly clarified monitor lineup would consist of the following:

- Dell: “Essential" consumer line for "everyday work and entertainment”
- Dell S: "Stylish" consumer line offering "an enhanced viewing experience”
- Dell Pro: "Essential" commercial line for “business productivity”
- Dell Pro P: Commercial line offering "enhanced performance, connectivity and collaboration”
- Dell UltraSharp: "Design-forward" line offering "unparalleled color accuracy and the best eye-comfort solutions"
- Alienware: Gaming monitors

The blog further claimed that "peripherals follow the same numeric series (Dell Pro 3, 5, 7) for consistency".
