= Dell Dimension =

Line of home and business desktop computers by Dell

- Last logo used from 2001 until 2007
- Developer: Dell
- Type: desktop
- Released: 1993
- Discontinued: April 9, 2007
- CPU: AMD, Intel
- Graphics: Intel Extreme Graphics, Intel GMA, ATI/AMD, Nvidia
- Successor: Inspiron (desktops)
- Related: Vostro, XPS

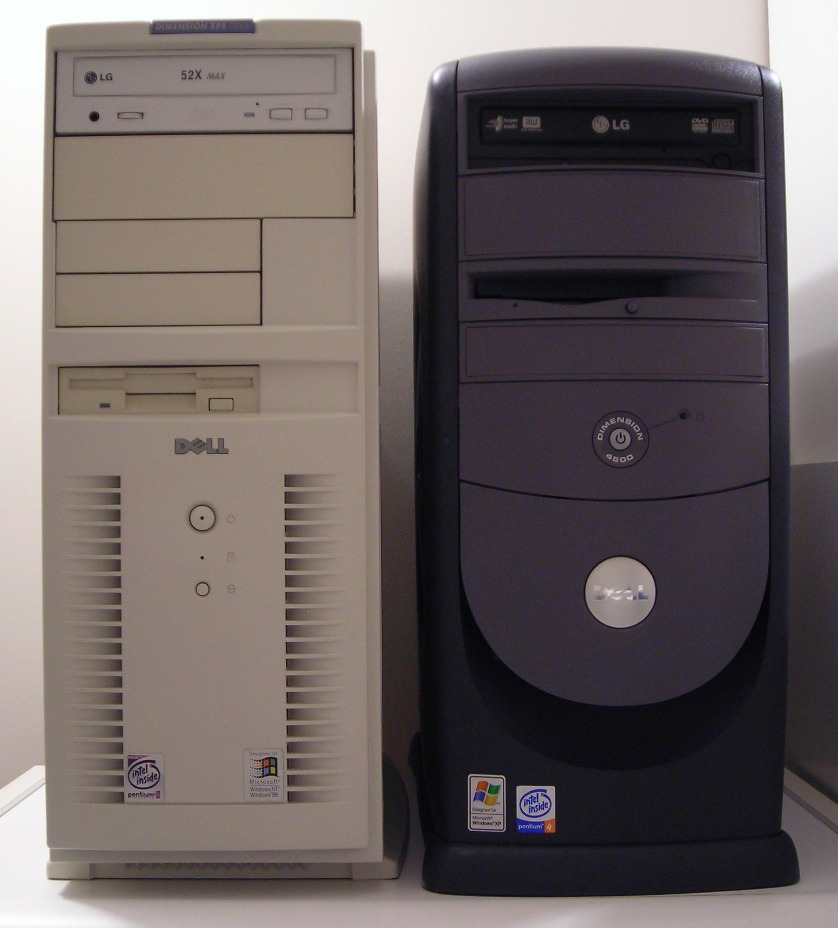
Two older Dell Dimension models. Left: Dell Dimension XPS D266; right: Dell Dimension 4500.

The Dell Dimension is a discontinued series of home and business desktop computers manufactured by Dell. In 2007, the Dimension series was discontinued and replaced with the Dell Inspiron series for low-end models and the Dell Studio series for higher-end models.

The last high-end computers to be released under the Dimension line were the 9200 and 9200c (XPS 410 and XPS 210 in the American market, respectively). The E520, E521 and C521 were re-introduced under the Inspiron line under the names Inspiron 530, 531, 530s, and 531s, with a revised case design.

== Model list ==
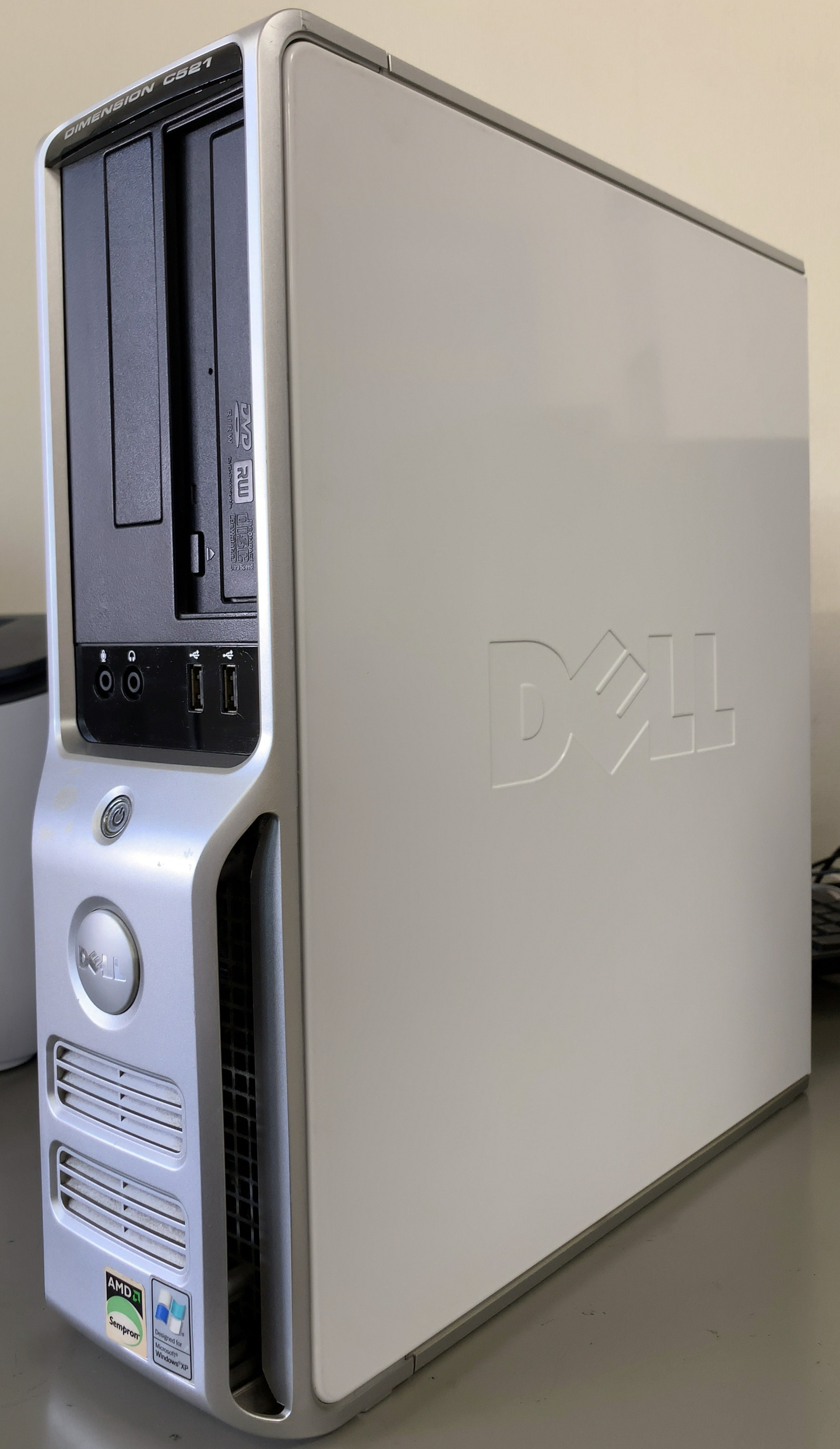
Dell Dimension C521

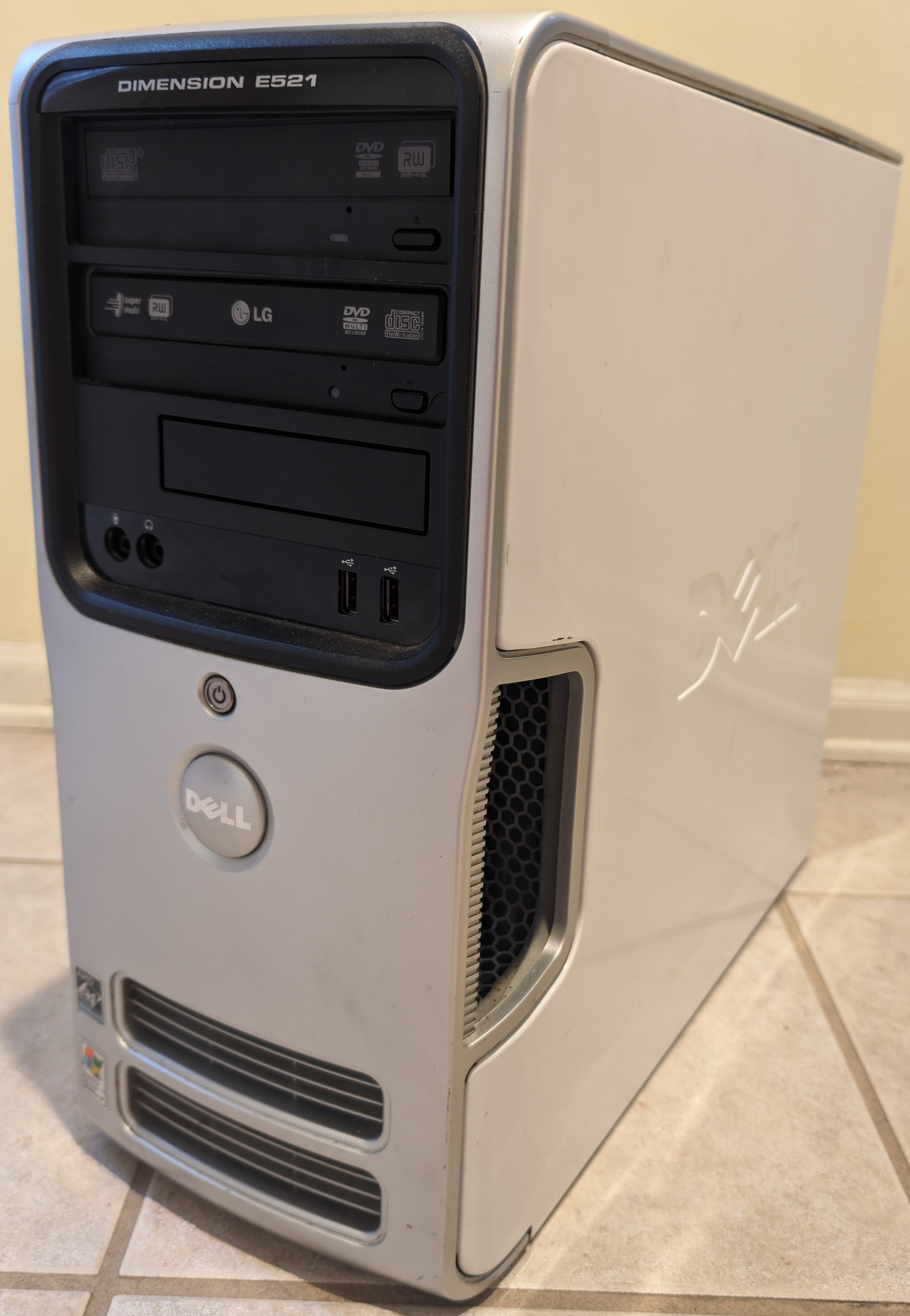
Dell Dimension E521

- Dimension 4xx Series - 433SV, 466V
- Dimension 9xx Series - 900
- Dimension 1xxx Series - 1000, 1100
- Dimension 2xxx Series - 2010, 2100, 2200, 2300, 2300C, 2350, 2400, 2400C
- Dimension 3xxx Series - 3000, 3100, 3100c, 3400, 3800
- Dimension 4xxx Series - 4100, 4200, 4300, 4300S, 4400, 4500, 4500C, 4500S, 4550, 4600, 4600C, 4700, 4700C, 4700 MCE, 4800
- Dimension 5xxx Series - 5000, 5100, 5150, 5150C, 5200, 5200C
- Dimension 8xxx Series - 8100, 8200, 8250, 8300, 8300N, 8400, 8400 MCE
- Dimension 9xxx Series - 9100, 9150, 9200, 9200C
- Dimension B Series - B110
- Dimension C Series - C521
- Dimension D Series - DE051
- Dimension E Series - E310, E510, E520, E521
- Dimension J Series
- Dimension L Series (Lxxx is MHz; R is PIII; C, CX, CXE are Celeron)
  - L___c - L400c, L433c, L466c, L500c
  - L___cx - L433cx, L500cx, L533cx, L566cx, L600cx, L633cx, L667cx, L700cx, L733cx, L800cx
  - L___cxe - L700cxe, L800cxe
  - L___r - L500r, L550r, L600r, L667r, L733r, L800r, L866r, L933r, L1000r, L1100r
- Dimension M Series - M166a, M200a, M233a
- Dimension P Series - P100a, P133a, P166a, P75t, P90t, P100t, P120t, P133t, P133v, P166v, P200v
- Dimension V Series - V333, V350, V400, V450, V333c, V400c, V433c, V466c
- Dimension XPS Series
  - XPS 4 - 466V
  - XPS B - B866, B933, B1000, B533r, B600r, B667r, B733r, B800r, B866r, B933r, B1000r
  - XPS D - D233, D266, D300, D333
  - XPS H - H233, H266
  - XPS M - M166s, M200s, M233s
  - XPS P - P60, P75, P90, P100, P90c, P100c, P120c, P133c, P150c, P166c, P133s, P166s, P200s
  - XPS Pro - Pro150, Pro200, Pro150n, Pro180n, Pro200n
  - XPS R - R350, R400, R450
  - XPS T - T450, T500, T550, T600, T600r, T650r, T700r, T750r, T800r, T850r

== Technical details ==
=== 4xx series ===
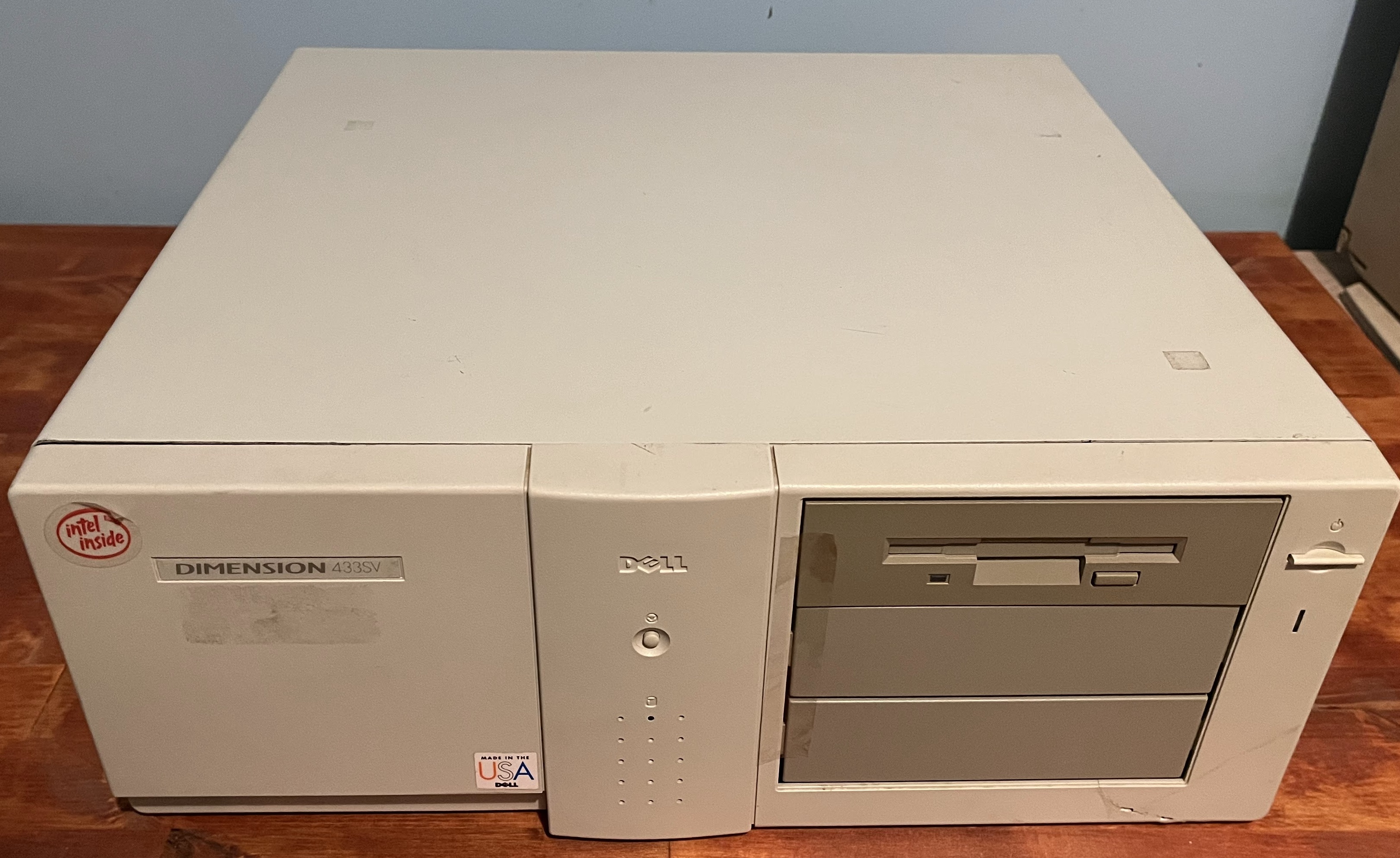
Dell Dimension 433SV

Model	Released	Chipset	Processor type	FSB	Memory				Video				Audio codec	Network card	Expansion Bus	Physical			
Model	Released	Chipset	Processor type	FSB	Architecture	Memory module slots	Maximum memory	Clock speed	Video type	Core Frequency	Video controller	Video memory	Audio codec	Network card	Expansion Bus	Height	Width	Depth	Weight
433SV	1993	Opti 82C801	Socket 1 Intel 486 SX 33 MHz	33 MHz	72-pin FPM DRAM	4 user-accessible FPM/EDO slots	64 MB	70 ns FPM DRAM	Integrated	80 MHz	Cirrus Logic GD5428	2 MB			3 ISA 16 bit, 2 VLB	8.5 In	17 In	17 In	
466V	1994	486	Socket 3 Intel 486 DX2 66 MHz	33 MHz	72-pin EDO DRAM	4 user-accessible FPM/EDO slots	64 MB	EDO DRAM	Integrated	80 MHz	Cirrus Logic GD5428	2 MB			3 ISA 16 bit, 2 VLB				

=== 9xx series ===
Model	Released	Chipset	Processor type	FSB	Memory				Video				Audio codec	Network card	Expansion Bus	Physical			
Model	Released	Chipset	Processor type	FSB	Architecture	Memory module slots	Maximum memory	Clock speed	Video type	Core Frequency	Video controller	Video memory	Audio codec	Network card	Expansion Bus	Height	Width	Depth	Weight
900 (Japan only)	2001	Intel 810e	Socket 370 Intel Pentium III (Coppermine) 866, 933, 1000 MHz Intel Celeron (Coppermine) 700, 800, 900, 1000, 1100 MHz	66, 100, 133 MHz	SDRAM	2 user-accessible SDRAM slots	512 MB max	PC100 SDRAM	Integrated		Intel Direct AGP 2D and 3D graphics accelerator	4 MB	AC' 97 AD1881		2 PCI	31.0 cm	7.8 cm	27.0 cm	6.6 kg (14.5 lb)

=== 1xxx series ===
Model	Released	Chipset	Processor type	Memory				Video				Audio codec	Network card	Expansion Bus	Physical			
Model	Released	Chipset	Processor type	Architecture	Memory module slots	Maximum memory	Clock speed	Video type	Core Frequency	Video controller	Video memory	Audio codec	Network card	Expansion Bus	Height	Width	Depth	Weight
1000	2009	Nvidia MCP61	AMD Athlon X2, Athlon II X2	DDR2 SDRAM	2 DDR2 SDRAM slots	4096 MB	800-MHz DDR2 unbuffered SDRAM	Integrated		Nvidia GeForce 6150 SE		VT1708B G		PCI, PCI Express (x1, x16), SATA	38.6 cm	18.5 cm	41.5 cm	6.5 kg (14.3 lb)
1100/B110	2006	Intel 865GV	Intel Pentium 4 with HT, Celeron	DDR2 SDRAM	2 user-accessible DDR SDRAM slots	2048 MB	333- and 400-MHz DDR SDRAM	Integrated		Intel Extreme Graphics 2	Dynamic	AC' 97 ADI 1980	10/100	3 PCI	41.9 cm	18.1 cm	36.8 cm	11.3 kg (25 lb)

=== 2xxx series ===
Model	Released	Chipset	Processor type	Memory				Video				Audio codec	Network card	Expansion Bus	Physical			
Model	Released	Chipset	Processor type	Architecture	Memory module slots	Maximum memory	Clock speed	Video type	Core Frequency	Video controller	Video memory	Audio codec	Network card	Expansion Bus	Height	Width	Depth	Weight
2010	2009	Nvidia MCP61P	AMD Athlon X2, Athlon II X2	DDR2 SDRAM	2 user-accessible DDR2 SDRAM slots	4096 MB	800-MHz DDR2 SDRAM (Non-ECC)	PCI Express x16				Integrated Standard Definition Audio		(1) PCI-Express x16, (1) PCI	37.9 cm	18.5 cm	17.2 cm	8.3 kg (18.29 lbs)
2100	2001	Intel 810e or Intel 810	Socket 370 Intel Celeron (Coppermine) 700, 800, 900, 1000, 1100 MHz Intel Pentium III (Coppermine) 933, 1000, 1100 MHz	SDRAM	2 user-accessible SDRAM slots	512 MB	PC100 SDRAM	Integrated		Intel 810e chipset with Dynamic Video Memory, 133-MHz display cache or Intel 810 chip set	4 MB (810e) Dynamic (810)			4 PCI	39 cm	16.8 cm	34 cm	9.9 kg (22 lb)
2200	2002	Intel 810e	Socket 370 Intel Celeron (Tualatin) @ 1.20, 1.30, 1.40 GHz	SDRAM	2 user-accessible SDRAM slots	512 MB	PC100 SDRAM	Integrated		Intel 3D AGP graphics	Dynamic	ADI 1885 (Optional)		4 PCI	39 cm	16.8 cm	34 cm	9.9 kg (22 lb)
2300	2002	Intel 845GL	Socket 478; Intel Celeron (Willamette-128) @ 1.70 GHz; Intel Pentium 4 (Northwood) @ 1.80 GHz	SDRAM	2 user-accessible SDRAM slots	1024 MB	PC133 SDRAM	Integrated		Intel integrated AGP graphics	Up to 32 MB System Memory	AC97		4 PCI	36.8 cm	18.4 cm	42.6 cm	10.4 kg (23 lb)
2300C	2002	Intel 845G	Socket 478 Intel Celeron (Willamette-128, Northwood-128) 1.70, 1.80, 2.00, 2.10, 2.20 GHz	DDR SDRAM	2 user-accessible DDR SDRAM slots	1024 MB	PC2100 (266-MHz) DDR SDRAM (non-ECC)	Integrated		Intel integrated AGP graphics	Up to 32 MB System Memory	ADI 1981A	10/100	1 AGP 4x, 3 PCI	32.3 cm	9.5 cm	35.6 cm	7.43 kg (16.4 lbs)
2350	2002	Intel 845GL	Socket 478 Intel Celeron (Willamette-128, Northwood-128) 1.70, 2.00, 2.10, 2.20, 2.30 GHz Intel Pentium 4 (Willamette, Northwood) 1.80, 2.00, 2.40, 2.50 GHz	DDR SDRAM	2 user-accessible DDR SDRAM slots	2048 MB (Officially 1024 MB)	PC2100 (266-MHz) DDR SDRAM (non-ECC)	Integrated		Intel 3D Extreme Graphics	Between 32 and 64 MB of system memory may be allocated to support graphics	integrated audio	10/100	3 PCI	36.8 cm	18.4 cm	42.6 cm	10.4 kg (23 lb)
2400	2003	Intel 845GV	Socket 478 Intel Celeron (Northwood-128) 2.0, 2.2, 2.3, 2.4, 2.5, 2.6, 2.7 GHz Intel Pentium 4 (Northwood) 2.2, 2.26, 2.4. 2.53. 2.66, 2.8, 3.06 GHz	DDR SDRAM	2 user-accessible DDR SDRAM slots	2048 MB (Officially 1024 MB)	PC2100 (266-MHz) or PC2700 (333-MHz) DDR SDRAM (non-ECC)	Integrated		Intel 3D Extreme Graphics	Between 32 and 64 MB of system memory may be allocated to support graphics	AC' 97	10/100	3 PCI	36.8 cm	18.4 cm	42.6 cm	10.4 kg (23 lb)

=== 3xxx and 5xxx series ===
Model	Released	Chipset	Processor type	Memory				Video				Audio codec	Network card	Expansion Bus	Physical			
Model	Released	Chipset	Processor type	Architecture	Memory module slots	Maximum memory	Clock speed	Video type	Core Frequency	Video controller	Video memory	Audio codec	Network card	Expansion Bus	Height	Width	Depth	Weight
3000	2004	Intel 865GV	Intel Celeron D (Prescott-256) @ 320, 325, 330, 335, 340 GHz Intel Pentium 4 (Prescott) @ 2.8 GHz Intel Pentium 4 with HT (Prescott) @ 2.8, 3.0, 3.2 GHz	DDR SDRAM	2 user-accessible DDR SDRAM slots	2048 MB	333- and 400-MHz DDR SDRAM	Integrated		Intel Extreme Graphics 2	Dynamic	AC97 ADI 1980	10/100	3 PCI	36.8 cm	18.4 cm	42.6 cm	10.4 kg (23 lb)
3100 and E310	2006	Intel 915GV	Intel Pentium 4 with HT, Celeron D	DDR2 SDRAM	2 user-accessible DDR2 SDRAM slots	2048 MB	400- and 533-MHz DDR2 unbuffered SDRAM	Integrated		Intel GMA 900	Dynamic	HDA	10/100	(2) PCI, (1) PCI-Express x1	41.4 cm	18.8 cm	45.7 cm	12.7 kg (28 lb)
5000	2005	Intel 915G Express	Intel Pentium 4 with HT	DDR2 SDRAM	4 user-accessible DDR2 SDRAM slots	4096 MB	400- and 533-MHz DDR2 SDRAM (Non-ECC)	Integrated Intel GMA 900, PCI Express (x16) (No Power Connector Draws Power Through Board)			Dynamic (8 MB of System Memory or 1 MB Configurable in BIOS)	Analog Devics AD1986 Codec		(2) PCI, (1) PCI-Express x1, (1) PCI-Express x16	41.4 cm	18.8 cm	45.7 cm	12.7 kg (28 lb)
5100	2005	Intel 945G Express	Intel Pentium 4 with HT	DDR2 SDRAM	4 user-accessible DDR2 SDRAM slots	4096 MB	400- and 533-MHz DDR2 unbuffered SDRAM (Non-ECC)	Integrated Intel GMA950			Dynamic	SigmaTel STAC9220		(2) PCI, (1) PCI-Express x1, (1) PCI-Express x16	41.3 cm	18.7 cm	45.9 cm	14.2 kg (32 lb)
5150 and E510	2006	Intel 945G Express	Intel Pentium D, Pentium 4 with HT, Celeron D	DDR2 SDRAM	4 user-accessible DDR2 SDRAM slots	4096 MB	400- and 533-MHz DDR2 unbuffered SDRAM	Integrated Intel GMA950			Dynamic	SigmaTel STAC9220		(2) PCI, (1) PCI-Express x1, (1) PCI-Express x16	41.4 cm	18.8 cm	45.7 cm	12.7 kg (28 lb)
E520	2006	Intel 965G Express	Intel Pentium 4, Pentium D, Core 2 Duo, Core 2 Quad	DDR2 SDRAM	4 user-accessible DDR2 SDRAM slots	8192 MB (Officially 4096 MB)	533- and 667-MHz DDR2 unbuffered SDRAM	Integrated (Optional), PCI Express x16		Intel GMA X3000	Dynamic	Sigmatel 9227	10/100	(2) PCI, (1) PCI-Express x1, (1) PCI-Express x16	41.4 cm	18.8 cm	45.7 cm	12.7 kg (28 lb)
E521	2006	Nvidia nForce 430	AMD Athlon 64 X2, Athlon 64, Sempron	DDR2 SDRAM	4 user-accessible DDR2 SDRAM slots	4096 MB (8192 MB*)	533-, 667- and 800-MHz DDR2 unbuffered SDRAM	Integrated, PCI Express x16		Nvidia GeForce 6150LE	Up to 128 MB System Memory	Sigmatel 9227	10/100	(2) PCI, (1) PCI-Express x1, (1) PCI-Express x16	41.4 cm	18.8 cm	45.7 cm	12.7 kg (28 lb)

* As of BIOS Revision 1.1.11 # As of BIOS Revision 2.4

=== 4xxx series ===
Model	Released	Chipset	Processor type	FSB	Memory				Video				Audio codec	Network card	Expansion Bus	Physical			
Model	Released	Chipset	Processor type	FSB	Architecture	Memory module slots	Maximum memory	Clock speed	Video type	Core Frequency	Video controller	Video memory	Audio codec	Network card	Expansion Bus	Height	Width	Depth	Weight
4100	2000	Intel 815e	Socket 370; Intel Celeron (Coppermine) @ 1000, 1100 MHz; Intel Pentium III (Coppermine) @ 667, 733, 800, 866, 933, 1000, 1100 MHz	100, 133 MHz	SDRAM	2 SDRAM slots	512 MB	PC133 SDRAM	AGP 2.0 video card (2x or 4x)		None onboard		AC' 97		1 AGP 4x, 5 PCI	43.7 cm	20.3 cm	44.5 cm	13.6 kg (30 lb)
4200	2001	Intel 815e	Socket 370; Intel Celeron (Coppermine) @ 800, 1000, 1100 MHz; Intel Pentium III (Coppermine) @ 866, 933, 1000 MHz	100, 133 MHz	SDRAM	2 SDRAM slots	512 MB	PC133 SDRAM	Integrated (Optional), AGP 2.0.		815E	4 MB (Optional)	SoundBlaster Pro/16 compatibility (Optional)		1 AGP 4x, 4 PCI	42.5 cm	18.1 cm	44.7 cm	12.7 kg (28 lb)
4300	2001	Intel 845	Intel Pentium 4 @ 1.5, 1.6, 1.7, 1.8, 1.9, 2.0 GHz	400 MHz	SDRAM	2 SDRAM slots	1024 MB (Officially 512 MB)	PC133 SDRAM	AGP 2.0 video card (4x)		None onboard		AD1885 AC97		1 AGP 4x, 4 PCI	42.5 cm	18.1 cm	44.7 cm	12.7 kg (28 lb)
4300S	2001	Intel 845	Intel Pentium 4 @ 1.4, 1.5, 1.6, 1.7, 1.8, 1.9 GHz	400 MHz	SDRAM	2 SDRAM slots	1024 MB (Officially 512 MB)	PC133 SDRAM	AGP 2.0 video card (4x)		None onboard		AD1885 AC97		1 AGP 4x, 2 PCI	10.6 cm	38.9 cm	43.2 cm	9.9 kg (22 lb)
4400	2002	Intel 845	Intel Pentium 4 @ 1.5, 1.6, 1.7, 1.8, 1.9, 2.0, 2.2, 2.4 GHz	400 MHz	DDR SDRAM	2 DDR SDRAM slots	1024 MB	PC2100 (266-MHz) DDR SDRAM	AGP 2.0 video card (4x)		None onboard		ADI 1885		1 AGP 4x, 4 PCI	42.5 cm	18.1 cm	44.7 cm	12.7 kg (28 lb)
4500	2002	Intel 845E	Socket 478 Intel Pentium 4 @ 1.6, 1.7, 1.8, 1.9, 2.0, 2.2, 2.26, 2.4, 2.53, 2.66. 2.8 GHz	400, 533 MHz	DDR SDRAM	2 DDR SDRAM slots	2048 MB (Officially 1024 MB)	PC2100 (266-MHz) DDR SDRAM	AGP 2.0 video card (4x)		None onboard		ADI 1981A (Optional)		1 AGP 4x, 4 PCI	42.5 cm	18.1 cm	44.7 cm	12.7 kg (28 lb)
4500S	2002	Intel 845G	Socket 478 Intel Celeron @ 1.7, 1.8, 2.0 GHz Intel Pentium 4 @ 1.7, 1.8, 1.9, 2.0, 2.26, 2.4, 2.53, 2.66 GHz	400, 533 MHz	DDR SDRAM	2 DDR SDRAM slots	2048 MB	PC2100 (266-MHz) DDR SDRAM	Integrated		Intel integrated AGP graphics		ADI 1981A		2 PCI	10.6 cm	38.9 cm	43.2 cm	9.9 kg (22 lb)
4500C	2002	Intel 845G	Socket 478 Intel Pentium 4 @ 1.7, 1.8, 1.9, 2.0, 2.2, 2.26, 2.4, 2.53, 2.8, 3.06 GHz	400, 533 MHz	DDR SDRAM	2 DDR SDRAM slots	1024 MB	PC2100 (266-MHz) DDR SDRAM	Integrated		Intel integrated AGP graphics		ADI 1981A		1 AGP 4x, 1 PCI	32.3 cm	9.5 cm	35.6 cm	7.43 kg (16.4 lb)
4550	2002	Intel 845PE	Socket 478 Intel Pentium 4 @ 1.8, 1.9, 2.0, 2.2, 2.26, 2.4, 2.53, 2.66, 2.8, 3.06 GHz	400, 533 MHz	DDR SDRAM	2 DDR SDRAM slots	1024 MB	PC2100 (266-MHz) or PC2700 (333-MHz) DDR SDRAM	AGP 2.0 video card (4x)		None onboard		ADI 1981A (Optional)	Integrated Intel 10/100 Ethernet/Intel 82562ET (10/100)	1 AGP 4x, 4 PCI	42.5 cm	18.1 cm	44.7 cm	12.7 kg (28 lb)
4600/C	2004	Intel 865PE or 865G	Socket 478 Intel Pentium 4, Pentium 4 with HT (2.26, 2.4, 2.533, 2.66, 2.8, or 3.06 GHz/533 & 2.4, 2.6, 2.8, 3.0, 3.2, or 3.4 GHz/800 w/512K or 1 MB Cache)		DDR SDRAM	4 DDR SDRAM slots (Two in the 4600C)	4096 MB (2048 MB in the 4600C)	PC2700 (333-MHz) or PC3200 (400-MHz) DDR SDRAM (non-ECC)	Intel Extreme Graphics controller, AGP video card (8x)				ADI 1980		PCI, AGP (8x), ATA-100, SATA	36.8 cm	18.4 cm	42.6 cm	10.4 kg (23 lb)
4700/C	2004	Intel 915G Express	LGA 775 Intel Pentium 4, Pentium 4 with HT		DDR2 SDRAM	4 DDR2 SDRAM slots	4096 MB	400-MHz (PC2-3200) and 533-MHz (PC2-4200) DDR2 unbuffered SDRAM non-ECC	Intel Extreme Graphics controller, PCI Express				ADI 1980		PCI, PCI Express (x1, x16), ATA-100, SATA	36.8 cm	18.4 cm	42.6 cm	10.4 kg (23 lb)

=== 8xxx series ===
- The Dimension 8200 shipped with two different motherboards, depending on the release date. The earlier version used the i850 chipset with a Socket 478 (400 MHz FSB), while the later version used the i850E chipset with a Socket 478 (400 MHz and 533 MHz FSB).

Model	Released	Chipset	Processor type	FSB	Memory				Video				Audio codec	Expansion Bus	Physical			
Model	Released	Chipset	Processor type	FSB	Architecture	Memory module slots	Maximum memory	Clock speed	Video type	Core Frequency	Video controller	Video memory	Audio codec	Expansion Bus	Height	Width	Depth	Weight
8100	2000	Intel 850	Socket 423; Intel Pentium 4 (Willamette); 1.3 - 2.0 GHz	400 MHz	RDRAM	4 RIMM slots	2048 MB	600- and 800-MHz ECC RDRAM RIMMs	AGP 66 MHz (4/2x)		None onboard			PCI (33 MHz), AGP 66 MHz (4/2x), EIDE	44.53 cm	20.57 cm	43.75 cm	15 kg (33 lb)
8200*	2001	Intel 850 or 850E	Socket 478; Intel Pentium 4/Celeron (Willamette/Northwood); 1.4 - 2.8 GHz; Socket 478; Intel Pentium 4/Celeron (Willamette/Northwood); 1.4 - 3.06 GHz	400 MHz (Intel 850), 400 and 533 MHz (850E)	RDRAM	4 RIMM slots	2048 MB	800 MHz non-ECC RDRAM RIMMs	AGP 66 MHz (4/2x)		None onboard		Analog Devices AD1885 AC’97 Codec	PCI (33 MHz), AGP 66 MHz (4/2x), EIDE	42.5 cm	18.1 cm	44.7 cm	12.7 kg (28 lb)
8250	2002	Intel 850E	Socket 478; Intel Pentium 4/Celeron (Willamette/Northwood); 1.4 - 3.06 GHz	400, 533 MHz	RDRAM	4 RIMM slots	2048 MB PC800 1532 MB PC1066	PC800 or PC1066 non-ECC RDRAM RIMMs	AGP 66 MHz (4/2x)		None onboard		Analog Devices AD1981a AC’97 Codec	PCI (33 MHz), AGP 66 MHz (4/2x), EIDE	42.5 cm	18.1 cm	44.7 cm	12.7 kg (28 lb)
8300/8300N	2003	Intel 875P	Socket 478; Intel Pentium 4/Celeron/Celeron D (Willamette/Northwood/Prescott/Gallatin); 1.4 - 3.4 GHz	400, 533, 800 MHz	DDR	4 DIMM slots	4096 MB	DDR 333 or 400 non-ECC	AGP 8x		None onboard		Analog Devices AD1980 AC’97 Codec	PCI (33 MHz), AGP 8x, IDE, SATA	42.5 cm	18.1 cm	44.7 cm	12.7 kg (28 lb)
8400	2004	Intel 925X/925XE Express	LGA 775; Intel Pentium 4 HT/Celeron/Celeron D (Prescott/Gallatin/Cedar Mill); 2.4 - 3.8 GHz	800, 1066 MHz	DDR2	4 DIMM slots	4096 MB	DDR2 400/533/667 MHz non-ECC	PCI Express		None onboard		Analog Devices AD1980 AC’97 Codec	PCI 2.3, PCI Express x1 and x16, IDE, SATA	42.5 cm	18.1 cm	44.7 cm	12.7 kg (28 lb)

=== 9xxx series ===
- The Dimension 9150 was known as the XPS 400 in United States markets, along with the Dimension 9200 being rebadged to XPS 410 in U.S. markets. Similarly, the Dimension 9200C was rebranded as XPS 210 in the United States.

Model	Released	Chipset	Processor type	FSB	Memory				Video				Audio codec	Expansion Bus	Physical			
Model	Released	Chipset	Processor type	FSB	Architecture	Memory module slots	Maximum memory	Clock speed	Video type	Core Frequency	Video controller	Video memory	Audio codec	Expansion Bus	Height	Width	Depth	Weight
9100	2005	Intel 945P Express	Intel Pentium 4 with HT/Pentium D		DDR2 SDRAM	4 DDR2 SDRAM slots	4096 MB	533- and 667-MHz DDR2 unbuffered SDRAM	PCI Express (x16)				Sigmatel STAC9220	PCI, PCI Express (x1, x16), SATA	44.4 cm	16.7 cm	44.4 cm	12.7 kg (28 lb)
9150 and XPS 400	2005	Intel 945P Express	Intel Pentium 4 with HT/Pentium D		DDR2 SDRAM	4 DDR2 SDRAM slots	4096 MB	533- and 667-MHz DDR2 unbuffered SDRAM	PCI Express (x16)				Sigmatel STAC9220	PCI, PCI Express (x1, x16), SATA	46.1 cm	18.8 cm	45.4 cm	12.7 kg (28 lb)
9200 and XPS 410	2006	Intel P965 Express	Intel Pentium 4 with HT/Pentium D/Core2 Duo/Core2 Quad		DDR2 SDRAM	4 DDR2 SDRAM slots	8192 MB	667- and 800-MHz DDR2 unbuffered SDRAM	PCI Express (x16)				Sigmatel STAC9227	PCI, PCI Express (x1, x16), SATA	46.1 cm	18.8 cm	45.4 cm	12.7 kg (28 lb)
9200C and XPS 210	2006	Intel G965 Express	Intel Celeron D/Pentium 4 with HT/Pentium D/Core2 Duo		DDR2 SDRAM	4 DDR2 SDRAM slots	4096 MB	533-, 667-, and 800-MHz DDR2 unbuffered SDRAM	PCI Express (x16)				Sigmatel STAC9227	PCI, PCI Express (x1, x16), SATA	31.8 cm	9.4 cm	36.8 cm	6.89 kg (15.2 lb)

=== L series ===
Model	Released	Chipset	Processor type	FSB	Memory				Video				Audio codec	Network card	Expansion Bus	Physical			
Model	Released	Chipset	Processor type	FSB	Architecture	Memory module slots	Maximum memory	Clock speed	Video type	Core Frequency	Video controller	Video memory	Audio codec	Network card	Expansion Bus	Height	Width	Depth	Weight
L___c	1999	Intel 810	Socket 370 Intel Celeron (Mendocino) @ 400, 433, 466, 500 MHz	66 MHz	SDRAM	2 DIMM slots	512 MB	PC100 SDRAM	Integrated		Intel 810 chip set with Dynamic Video Memory	4 MB display cache memory	Creative Sound Blaster Audio PCI chip with 64-voice wavetable synthesis (Optional)	Intel Pro 10/100-Mbps 82559 chip (Optional)	4 PCI	39 cm	16.8 cm	34 cm	9.9 kg (22 lb)
L___cx	2000	Intel 810e	Socket 370 Intel Celeron (Mendocino, Coppermine) @ 433, 500, 533, 566, 600, 633, 667, 700, 733, 800 MHz	66, 100 MHz	SDRAM	2 DIMM slots	512 MB	PC100 SDRAM	Integrated		Intel 810e chip set with Dynamic Video Memory	4 MB display cache memory	Creative Sound Blaster Audio PCI chip with 64-voice wavetable synthesis (Optional)	Intel Pro 10/100-Mbps 82559 chip (Optional)	4 PCI	39 cm	16.8 cm	34 cm	9.9 kg (22 lb)
L___cxe	2001	Intel 810	Socket 370 Intel Celeron (Coppermine) 700, 800 MHz	100 MHz	SDRAM	2 DIMM slots	512 MB	PC100 SDRAM	Integrated		Intel 810 chip set with Dynamic Video Memory	1-2 MB	Creative Sound Blaster Audio PCI chip with 64-voice wavetable synthesis (Optional)	Intel Pro 10/100-Mbps 82559 chip (Optional)	4 PCI	39 cm	16.8 cm	34 cm	9.9 kg (22 lb)
L___r	2000	Intel 810e	Socket 370 Intel Pentium III (Coppermine) @ 500, 550, 600, 667, 733, 800, 866, 933, 1000, 1100 MHz	100, 133 MHz	SDRAM	2 DIMM slots	512 MB	PC100 SDRAM	Integrated		Intel 810e chip set with Dynamic Video Memory	4 MB display cache memory	Creative Sound Blaster Audio PCI chip with 64-voice wavetable synthesis (Optional)	Intel Pro 10/100-Mbps 82559 chip (Optional)	4 PCI	39 cm	16.8 cm	34 cm	9.9 kg (22 lb)

=== M series ===
Model	Released	Chipset	Processor type	FSB	Memory				Video				Audio codec	Expansion Bus	Physical			
Model	Released	Chipset	Processor type	FSB	Architecture	Memory module slots	Maximum memory	Clock speed	Video type	Core Frequency	Video controller	Video memory	Audio codec	Expansion Bus	Height	Width	Depth	Weight
M___a		Intel 430VX	Socket 7 Intel Pentium MMX (P55C) @ 166, 200, 233 MHz	66 MHz	SDRAM	2	64 MB				S3 Virge DX	2 MB	None onboard	3 ISA, 3 PCI	43.69 cm	20.32 cm	44.45 cm	11.3 to 13.6 kg (25 to 30 lb)

=== P series ===
Model	Released	Chipset	Processor type	FSB	Memory				Video				Audio codec	Expansion Bus	Physical			
Model	Released	Chipset	Processor type	FSB	Architecture	Memory module slots	Maximum memory	Clock speed	Video type	Core Frequency	Video controller	Video memory	Audio codec	Expansion Bus	Height	Width	Depth	Weight
P___a		Intel 430VX	Socket 7 Intel Pentium (P54CS) @ 133, 166 MHz	66 MHz	SDRAM	2 DIMM slots	64 MB		Integrated		S3 Virge DX	2 MB	None onboard	3 ISA, 3 PCI	43.69 cm	20.32 cm	44.45 cm	11.3 to 13.6 kg (25 to 30 lb)
P___t		Intel 430FX	Socket 7 Intel Pentium (P54C) @ 75, 90, 100, 120, 166 MHz	50, 60, 66 MHz	Fast-Page Mode or EDO DRAM	4 SIMM slots	128 MB		Integrated		S3 Trio64 or Trio64+	1 MB, upgradable to 2 MB	None onboard	3 ISA, 4 PCI	40.64 cm	20.32 cm	40.64 cm	11.3 kg (25 lb)
P___v		Intel 430VX	Socket 7 Intel Pentium @ 133, 166, 200 MHz	66 MHz	SDRAM	2 DIMM slots	64 MB	PC66 SDRAM	Integrated		S3 Trio 64V+	1 MB standard, upgradable to 2 MB	None onboard	3 ISA, 3 PCI	43.69 cm	20.32 cm	44.45 cm	11.3 to 13.6 kg (25 to 30 lb)

=== V series ===
Model	Released	Chipset	Processor type	FSB	Memory				Video				Audio codec	Network card	Expansion Bus	Physical			
Model	Released	Chipset	Processor type	FSB	Architecture	Memory module slots	Maximum memory	Clock speed	Video type	Core Frequency	Video controller	Video memory	Audio codec	Network card		Height	Width	Depth	Weight
V___	1998	Intel 440BX	Slot 1 Intel Pentium II (Deschutes) @ 333, 350, 400 MHz	66, 100 MHz	SDRAM	3 DIMM slots	384 MB	PC100 SDRAM	Integrated		ATI Rage Pro AGP 2X	8 MB	Yamaha DS-1 (Optional)	Intel EtherExpress Pro/100B (Optional)	2 ISA, 3 PCI	43.69 cm	20.32 cm	44.45 cm	11.3 to 13.6 kg (25.0 to 30.0 lb)
V___c	1998	Intel 440BX	Slot 1 Intel Celeron (Mendocino) @ 333, 400, 433, 466 (Note: Dell lists this speed in the technical specifications, however the "V466c" model does not seem to have been released, and Intel never released a 466 MHz Slot 1 Celeron.) MHz	66 MHz	SDRAM	3 DIMM slots	384 MB	PC100 SDRAM	Integrated		ATI Rage Pro AGP 2X	8 MB	Yamaha DS-1 (Optional)	Intel EtherExpress Pro/100B (Optional)	2 ISA, 3 PCI	43.69 cm	20.32 cm	44.45 cm	11.3 to 13.6 kg (25.0 to 30.0 lb)

=== XPS series ===
Model	Released	Chipset	Processor type	FSB	Memory				Video				Audio codec	Expansion Bus	Physical			
Model	Released	Chipset	Processor type	FSB	Architecture	Memory module slots	Maximum memory	Clock speed	Video type	Core Frequency	Video controller	Video memory	Audio codec	Expansion Bus	Height	Width	Depth	Weight
P60	1994	Intel 82378IB, 82433LX, and 82434LX	Intel Pentium @ 60 MHz	60 MHz	Fast Page Mode DRAM	4 SIMM slots	128 MB		PCI		None onboard		None onboard					
P75/P90/P100	1995	Intel 430NX	Socket 5 Intel Pentium (P54C) @ 75, 90, 100 MHz	50, 60, 66 MHz	Fast Page Mode DRAM	4 SIMM slots	128 MB		PCI		None onboard		None onboard	5 ISA, 3 PCI	40.64 cm (Mini-tower)	20.32 cm	40.64 cm	13.6 kg (29.98 lb)
P___c	1995-1996	Intel 430FX	Socket 7 Intel Pentium (P54C) @ 90, 100, 120, 133, 150, 166 MHz	60, 66 MHz	Fast Page Mode or EDO DRAM	4 SIMM slots	128 MB		PCI		None onboard		None onboard	4 ISA, 4 PCI	40.64 cm	20.32 cm	40.64 cm	11.3-13.6 kg (25-30 lb)
P___s	1996	Intel 430VX	Socket 7 Intel Pentium (P54CS) @ 133, 166, 200 MHz	66 MHz	SDRAM	2 DIMM slots	64 MB	PC66 SDRAM	PCI		None onboard		Creative Labs Vibra16	3 ISA, 4 PCI	43.7 cm	20.32 cm	44.45 cm	11.3-13.6 kg (25-30 lb)
Pro___	1995	Intel 450KX	Socket 8 Intel Pentium Pro @ 150, 200 MHz	60, 66 MHz	Fast Page Mode DRAM	4 SIMM slots	128 MB		PCI		None onboard		None onboard	3 ISA, 4 PCI	40 cm	20.32 cm	40.64 cm	11.3-13.6 kg (25-30 lb)
Pro___n	1996	Intel 440FX	Socket 8 Intel Pentium Pro @ 150, 180, 200 MHz	60, 66 MHz	Fast Page Mode or EDO DRAM	4 SIMM slots	128 MB		PCI		None onboard		None onboard	4 ISA, 4 PCI	43.7 cm	20.32 cm	44.45 cm	11.3-13.6 kg (25-30 lb)
M___s	1996	Intel 430VX	Socket 7 Intel Pentium MMX (P55C) @ 166, 200, 233 MHz	66 MHz	SDRAM	2 DIMM slots	64 MB	PC66 SDRAM	PCI		None onboard		Creative Labs Vibra16c	3 ISA, 4 PCI	43.7 cm	20.32 cm	44.45 cm	11.3-13.6 kg (25-30 lb)
H___	1997	Intel 440FX	Slot 1 Intel Pentium II (Klamath) @ 233, 266 MHz	66 MHz	EDO DRAM	4 SIMM slots	128 MB		PCI		None onboard		Yamaha OPL3-SA2	3 ISA, 4 PCI	43.7 cm	20.32 cm	44.45 cm	11.3-13.6 kg (25-30 lb)
D___	1997	Intel 440LX	Slot 1 Intel Pentium II (Klamath) @ 233, 266, 300, 333 MHz	66 MHz	SDRAM	3 DIMM slots	384 MB	PC66 SDRAM	AGP 2x		None onboard		Yamaha OPL3-SA3 (Optional)	2 ISA, 4 PCI	43.7 cm	20.32 cm	44.45 cm	11.3-13.6 kg (25-30 lb)
R___	1998	Intel 440BX	Slot 1 Intel Pentium II (Deschutes) @ 350, 400, 450 MHz	100 MHz	SDRAM	3 DIMM slots	384 MB	PC100 SDRAM	AGP 2x		None onboard		Crystal CS4236 (Optional)	2 ISA, 4 PCI	43.7 cm	20.32 cm	44.45 cm	11.3-13.6 kg (25-30 lb)
T___	1999	Intel 440BX	Slot 1 Intel Pentium III (Katmai) @ 450, 500, 550, 600 MHz	100 MHz	SDRAM	3 DIMM slots	768 MB	PC100 SDRAM	AGP 2x		None onboard		Yamaha 724 DS-1 (Optional)	1 ISA, 5 PCI	43.7 cm	20.32 cm	44.45 cm	11.3-13.6 kg (25-30 lb)
T___r	1999	Intel 440BX	Slot 1 Intel Pentium III (Coppermine) @ 600, 650, 700, 750, 800, 850 MHz	100 MHz	SDRAM	3 DIMM slots	768 MB	PC100 SDRAM	AGP 2x		None onboard		Yamaha 724 DS-1 (Optional)	1 ISA, 5 PCI	43.7 cm	20.32 cm	44.45 cm	11.3-13.6 kg (25-30 lb)
B___	2000	Intel 820	Socket 370 Intel Pentium III (Coppermine) @ 866, 933, 1000 MHz	133 MHz	RDRAM	2 RIMM slots	1024 MB (Officially 512 MB)	PC600, PC700, PC800 RDRAM	AGP 4x		None onboard		None onboard	5 PCI	43.7 cm	20.32 cm	44.45 cm	11.3-13.6 kg (25-30 lb)
B___r	2000	Intel 820	Slot 1 Intel Pentium III (Coppermine) @ 533, 600, 667, 733, 800, 866, 933, 1000 MHz	133 MHz	RDRAM	2 RIMM slots	1024 MB (Officially 512 MB)	PC600, PC700, PC800 RDRAM	AGP 4x		None onboard		None onboard	5 PCI	43.7 cm	20.32 cm	44.45 cm	11.3-13.6 kg (25-30 lb)
