= Dell Vostro =

Line of laptop and desktop computers by Dell

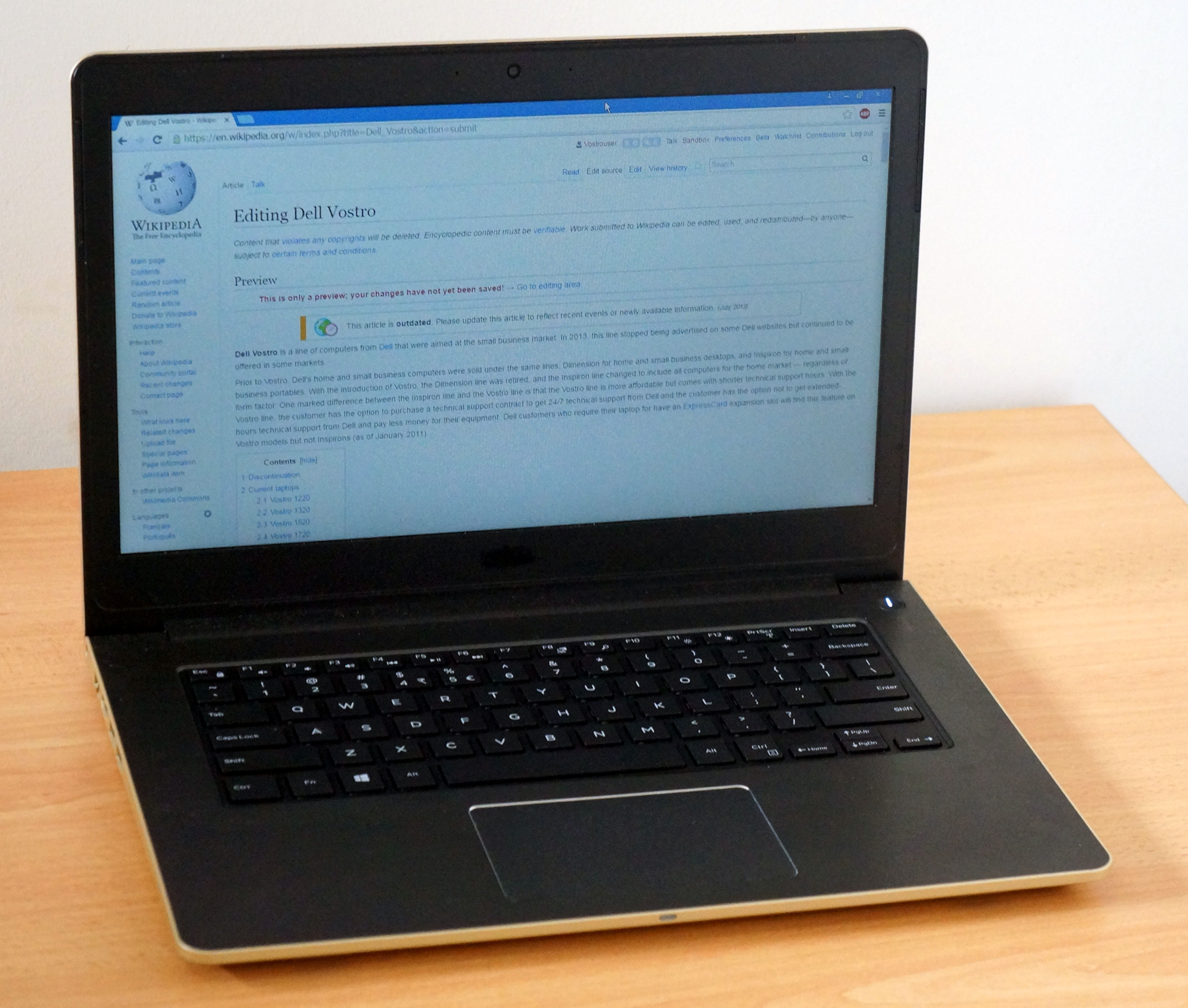
- A Dell Vostro 14 V5459-50814G-DOS laptop
- Developer: Dell
- Manufacturer: Dell
- Type: Laptop, Desktop
- Released: 2007
- Discontinued: 2024
- Operating system: Windows
- CPU: AMD, Intel
- Graphics: Intel, AMD, Nvidia
- Marketing target: Business
- Related: Latitude, XPS, Inspiron
- Website: Dell Vostro

Dell Vostro (Latin for yours) is a discontinued line of business-oriented laptop and desktop computers manufactured by Dell aimed at small to medium range businesses.

Prior to Vostro, Dell's home and small business computers were sold under the same lines: Dimension for home and small business desktops, and Inspiron for home and small business portables. With the introduction of Vostro, the Dimension line was discontinued, and the Inspiron line changed to include all computers for the home market; regardless of form factor. One marked difference between the Inspiron line and the Vostro line is that the Vostro line is cheaper and comes with shorter technical support hours.

Vostro was introducted in 2007, and existed until 2024 when it was merged into Inspiron.

== Laptops ==
=== Vostro 3000 ===
==== Vostro 15 (3000) ====
The Vostro 15 3000 is a laptop line with a 15-inch display aimed at small and medium businesses. It is an affordable version of the 5000 15-inch line.

3558 — is a model with a 15.6-inch HD display with anti-glare aimed at small business. The operating system options are the ones offered with the Vostro 3368.

- CPU: Intel Core i3 6100U, Core i3 6005U or Core i5 7200U
- Display: 15.6" LED-backlit (1366×768) with anti-glare
- Memory: DDR3 modules of 4 or 8 GB @ 1600 MHz
- Chipset: Intel Corporation 6 Series/C200 series chipset ko (Sandy Bridge) – Intel HM67
- Optical Drive: Dual-layer 8X DVD+/-CD drive
- Graphics: Intel HD 4400 or Nvidia Geforce 2 GB
- Security Hardware: Security slot
- Storage: 1x SATA, 1 TB HDD (5400 RPM)
- Wireless: DELL Wireless N 1705 @ 2.4 GHz + Bluetooth 4.0
- Webcam: Integrated HD 720p webcam (UVC video)
- Battery: 4-cell lithium-Ion
- Starting Price: $349

3578 —

3591

==== Vostro 3000 Desktop Series ====
3681 The Dell Vostro 3681 is a compact, miniature desktop computer tower, utilizing Small Form Factor hardware. Specifications vary by retailer, but all Vostro 3681 Desktop computers share the following characteristics:

- Memory: Features 2 slots for DIMM Random-Access Memory Cards, compatible with DDR4 memory modules, up to 16GB per slot, for a maximum of 32 GB RAM with maximum ⁵⁵⁵.
- Processor: Intel Core, i3 10XXX processor, base speeds starting at 3GHz, and supports overclocking.
- Storage: The 3681 Small Form Factor Desktop has slots for HDD and SSD; Compatible with M.2 2280 PCIe SSDs.
- Operating System: Windows 10 Professional; features free upgrade to Windows 11 Professional.

=== Vostro 5000 ===
==== Vostro 13 (53##) ====
5370

==== Vostro 14 (54##) (2015) ====
The Vostro 14 5000, released 23 October, 2015, was a laptop with a 14-inch display aimed at small business. (Ubuntu, Windows 8.1, Windows 10).

5459 — Operating system options are Ubuntu or Windows (8.1 and 10), and it is compatible with Windows 7. The starting price is $550.

- CPU: Intel Core i3-6100U, i5-6200U or i7-6500U
- Display: 14" LED-backlit (1366×768) with anti-glare
- Memory: 4 or 8 GB DDR3L @ 1600 MHz (up to 8 GB supported)
- Graphics: Intel HD 520, optional Nvidia GeForce 930M, 2 GB/4 GB DDR3
- Security Hardware: Fingerprint reader (optional)
- Storage: 1x SATA (500 GB or 1 TB (5400 RPM) HDD)
- Wireless: Intel 3165AC + BT4.0 (802.11ac + Bluetooth 4.0, dual band 2.4&5 GHz, 1x1)
- Webcam: Integrated HD 720p (1.0 MP)
- Battery: 43 WHr, 3-cell battery

This laptop has since been updated with Intel's Kaby Lake, Kaby Lake R and Whisky Lake processors.

5471 — Dec. 2017 with a starting price of $776

- CPU: Intel Core i5-8250U (up to 3.40 GHz) or Intel Core i7-8550U (up to 4.00 GHz)
- Display: 14" FHD (1920 x 1080) anti-glare LED-backlit display
- Memory: 8 GB Up to 32 GB, 2400 MHz* DDR4 SoDIMM (2 slots)
- Graphics: Intel UHD Graphics 620 with AMD Radeon 530 Graphics with 2 GB/4 GB GDDR5 vRAM
- Security Hardware: Fingerprint reader (optional)
- Storage: Dual-drive config with 500 GB/1 TB 5400RPM hard drive + M.2 SDD solid state drive
- Wireless: Intel (R) Dual Band Wireless-AC 3165 + Intel (R) Wireless Bluetooth 4.2
- Webcam: Integrated 720p HD camera with microphones
- Battery: 3-cell prismatic battery (42WHr)
- Audio: Integrated stereo speakers (2 W x 2)

HD audio enhanced with Waves MaxxAudio® Pro software

- Keyboard: Backlit Keyboard

Display

5481 — Sept. 2018 with a starting price of $670.

- CPU: Intel Core up to i7-8565U (4 × 1.8 GHz)
- Display: 14" LED-backlit (1366×768 or 1920×1080) with anti-glare
- Memory: 8 GB DDR4 (up to 32 GB supported)
- Graphics: Intel UHD 620, optional Nvidia GeForce MX130, 2 GB GDDR5
- Security Hardware: optional fingerprint reader
- Storage: 1x SATA 256 GB SSD or 1 TB HDD (5400 RPM), 1x M.2 (NVMe)

5491 —

==== Vostro 15 (55##) ====
5568 — features Intel Kaby Lake microprocessors

- CPU: Intel Core i5-7200U (2 × 2.5 GHz, turbo boost up to 3.1 GHz)
- Display: 15.6" LED-backlit (1920×1080) with anti-glare
- Memory: 8 GB DDR4 @ 1600 MHz (up to 32 GB supported)
- Graphics: Intel HD 620, optional Nvidia GeForce 940MX, 2 GB/4 GB GDDR5
- Security Hardware: fingerprint reader
- Storage: 1x SATA 256 GB SSD or 1 TB HDD (5400 RPM)
- Wireless: Intel 3165AC + BT4.0 (802.11ac + Bluetooth 4.1, dual band 2.4&5 GHz, 1x1)
- Webcam: Integrated HD 720p (1.0 MP)
- Battery: 45 WHr, 4-cell battery

5581 — Sept. 2018, starting price is $580.

- CPU: Intel Core up to i7-8565U (4 × 1.8 GHz)
- Display: 15.6" LED-backlit (1920×1080) with anti-glare
- Memory: 8 GB DDR4 (up to 32 GB supported)
- Graphics: Intel UHD 620, optional Nvidia GeForce MX130, 2 GB GDDR5
- Security Hardware: fingerprint reader
- Storage: 1x SATA 256 GB SSD or 1 TB HDD (5400 RPM), 1x M.2 (NVMe)
- Battery: 45 WHr, 4-cell battery

=== Vostro 1000 (2007) ===
The Vostro 1000, released 10 July, 2007, was Dell's 15.4" business laptop using AMD's Socket S1 processors.

- CPU: AMD Athlon 64 X2 TK-53, Mobile AMD Sempron 3500+, 3600+
- Display: 15.4" 1280×800 WXGA anti-glare
- Memory: 1 GB single-channel DDR2 SDRAM @ 800 MHz, up to 2 GB dual-channel DDR2 SDRAM @ 800 MHz
- Optical Drive: 8x DVD+/-R drive, 8x DVD+/-RW drive
- Graphics: ATI Radeon Xpress 1150, Core: 100 MHz, Memory: 400 MHz, up to 320 MB shared memory.
- Storage: 1x SATA, 60 GB (5400 rpm), 80 GB (5400 rpm)
- Wireless: Dell Wireless 1395
- Bluetooth:
- Webcam:
- Battery: 4-cell lithium-ion
- OS: Windows XP or Vista

=== Vostro 1200 (2008) ===
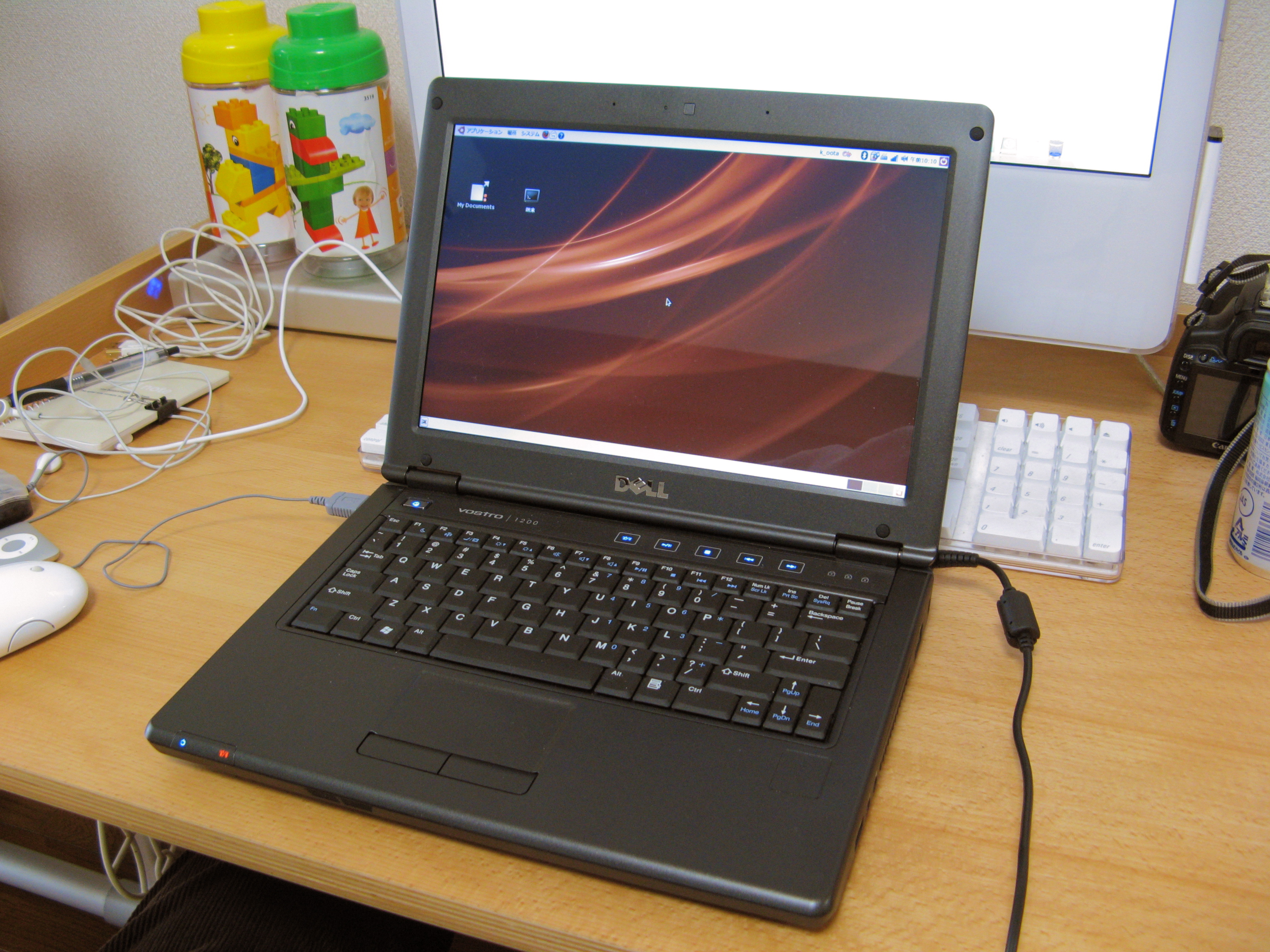
Vostro 1200

The Vostro 1200, released 18 December, 2007, was Dell's 12.1" laptop.

- CPU: Intel GM965 Core 2 Duo 2 GHz
- Display: 12.1" 1280×800
- Memory: 2 GB single-channel DDR2 SDRAM @ 800 MHz or 4 GB
- Optical Drive: 8X DVD+/-RW drive, Blu-ray disc combo drive
- Graphics: Intel GMA X3100
- Storage: 1x SATA, 160 GB (5400 RPM) HDD
- OS: (Windows XP or Vista)

=== Vostro 1220 (2009) ===
The Vostro 1220, released 1 July, 2009, was Dell's 12.1" business laptop based on the Intel Montevina platform.

- CPU: Intel Celeron 900, Core 2 Duo T6600, P8600, P8700, or T9550
- Display: 12.1" WXGA w/TrueLife
- Memory: 2 GB single-channel DDR2 SDRAM @ 800 MHz, 2, 3, 4, or 8 GB of shared dual-channel DDR2 SDRAM @ 800 MHz
- Optical Drive: 8X DVD+/-RW drive, Blu-ray disc combo drive
- Graphics: Integrated Intel GMA 4500MHD
- Security Hardware: Wave Encryption software
- Storage: 1x SATA, 160 GB (5400 RPM), 250, 320, or 500 GB (7200 RPM w/Freefall sensor), or 250 GB encrypted HDD (7200RPM w/Free Fall Sensor and Wave software), 128 GB SSD
- Wireless: Dell Wireless 1397 or 1510 mini card, Intel WiFi Link 5100, WiMAX/WiFi Link 5150, or 5300 mini card
- Bluetooth: Dell Wireless 365 Bluetooth 2.0
- Webcam: Integrated 1.3 MP webcam w/digital mic, optional free video chat software
- Battery: 4-cell or 6-cell lithium-ion
- OS: Windows XP and Windows 7
- Starting Price: $747

=== Vostro 1310 (2008) ===
Released 1 May, 2008. Windows XP or Vista.

=== Vostro 1400 (2007) ===
Released 10 July, 2007. Windows XP or Vista.

=== Vostro 14 ===
The Vostro 14 was Dell's 13.3" business laptop based on the Montevina platform.

- CPU: Intel Celeron 900, Core 2 Duo T6600, P7550, P8600, P8700, or T9550
- Display: 13.3" WXGA anti-glare, UltraSharp WXGA w/TrueLife
- Memory: 2 GB single-channel DDR2 SDRAM @ 800 MHz, 2, 3, 4, or 8 GB of shared dual-channel DDR2 SDRAM @ 800 MHz
- Optical Drive: 8X DVD+/-RW drive, Blu-ray disc combo drive
- Graphics: Integrated Intel GMA 4500MHD, or Nvidia GeForce 9300M GS
- Security Hardware: Fingerprint reader w/DigitalPersona software, Wave Encryption software
- Storage: 1x SATA, 120 GB (5400 RPM), 250 or 320 GB (7200 RPM w/Free Fall Sensor), or 250 GB encrypted hard drive (7200RPM w/Free Fall Sensor and Wave software), 128 GB SSD
- Wireless: Dell Wireless 1397 or 1510 mini card, Intel WiFi Link 5100 or 5300 mini card, atherones
- Bluetooth: Dell Wireless 355 Bluetooth 2.0
- Webcam: Integrated 1.3 MP webcam w/digital mic, optional free video chat software
- Battery: 4-cell, 6-cell, or 9-cell lithium-ion
- Starting Price: $550

=== Vostro 1500 (2007) ===
Released 10 July, 2007. Windows XP or Vista.

=== Vostro 1510 (2008) ===
The Vostro 1510, released 1 May, 2008, was Dell's 15.4" business laptop based on the Montevina platform. The design was based on Inspiron 1510 with a glossy black finish.

- CPU: Intel Celeron 900, Core 2 Duo T6600, P7550, P8600, P8700, or T9550
- Display: 15.4" WXGA anti-glare LED, WXGA+ anti-glare, WXGA+ w/TrueLife
- Memory: 2 GB single-channel DDR2 SDRAM @ 800 MHz, 2, 3, 4, or 8 GB of shared dual-channel DDR2 SDRAM @ 800 MHz
- Optical Drive: 8X DVD+/-RW drive, Blu-ray disc combo drive
- Graphics: Integrated Intel GMA 4500MHD, or Nvidia GeForce 9300M GS
- Security Hardware: Optional fingerprint reader w/DigitalPersona software, Wave Encryption software
- Storage: 1x SATA, 160 GB (5400 RPM), 250 or 320 GB (7200 RPM w/Free Fall Sensor), or 250 GB encrypted hard drive (7200RPM w/Free Fall Sensor & Wave software), 128 GB SSD
- Wireless: Dell Wireless 1397 or 1510 mini card, Intel WiFi Link 5100 or 5300 mini card
- Bluetooth: Dell Wireless 355 Bluetooth 2.0
- Webcam: Integrated 1.3 MP webcam w/digital mic, optional free video chat software
- Battery: 4-cell, 6-cell, or 9-cell lithium-ion battery
- OS: Windows XP or Windows Vista

=== Vostro 1700 (2007) ===
Released 10 July, 2007. Windows XP or Vista.

=== Vostro 1710 (2008) ===
Released 15 May, 2008. Windows XP or Vista.

=== Vostro 1720 ===
The Vostro 1720 is Dell's 17" business laptop based on the Montevina platform.

- CPU: Intel Celeron 900, Core 2 Duo T6600, P7550, P8600, P8700, or T9550 (Up to Core 2 duo T9900/X9000/X9100 3.06 GHz 1066FSB E0; confirmed supported with PM45 Chipset, No Core 2 Quad (Q or QX series)
- Display: 17" WXGA+ anti-glare LED, UltraSharp WUXGA w/TrueLife
- Memory: 2 GB single channel DDR2 SDRAM @ 800 MHz, 2, 3, 4, or 8 GB of shared dual channel DDR2 SDRAM @ 800 MHz
- Optical Drive: 8X DVD+/-RW drive, Blu-ray disc combo drive
- Graphics: Integrated Intel GMA 4500MHD, or Nvidia GeForce 9600M GS
- Security Hardware: Fingerprint reader w/DigitalPersona software, Wave Encryption software
- Storage: 1x SATA, 160 GB (5400 RPM), 250 or 320 GB (7200 RPM w/Free Fall Sensor), 250 GB encrypted hard drive (7200RPM w/Free Fall Sensor & Wave software), 128 GB SSD
- Wireless: Dell Wireless 1397 or 1510 mini card, Intel WiFi Link 5100 or 5300 mini card
- Bluetooth: Dell Wireless 355 Bluetooth 2.0
- Battery: 6-cell or 8-cell lithium-ion
- Starting Price: $599

=== Vostro A90 and A90n ===
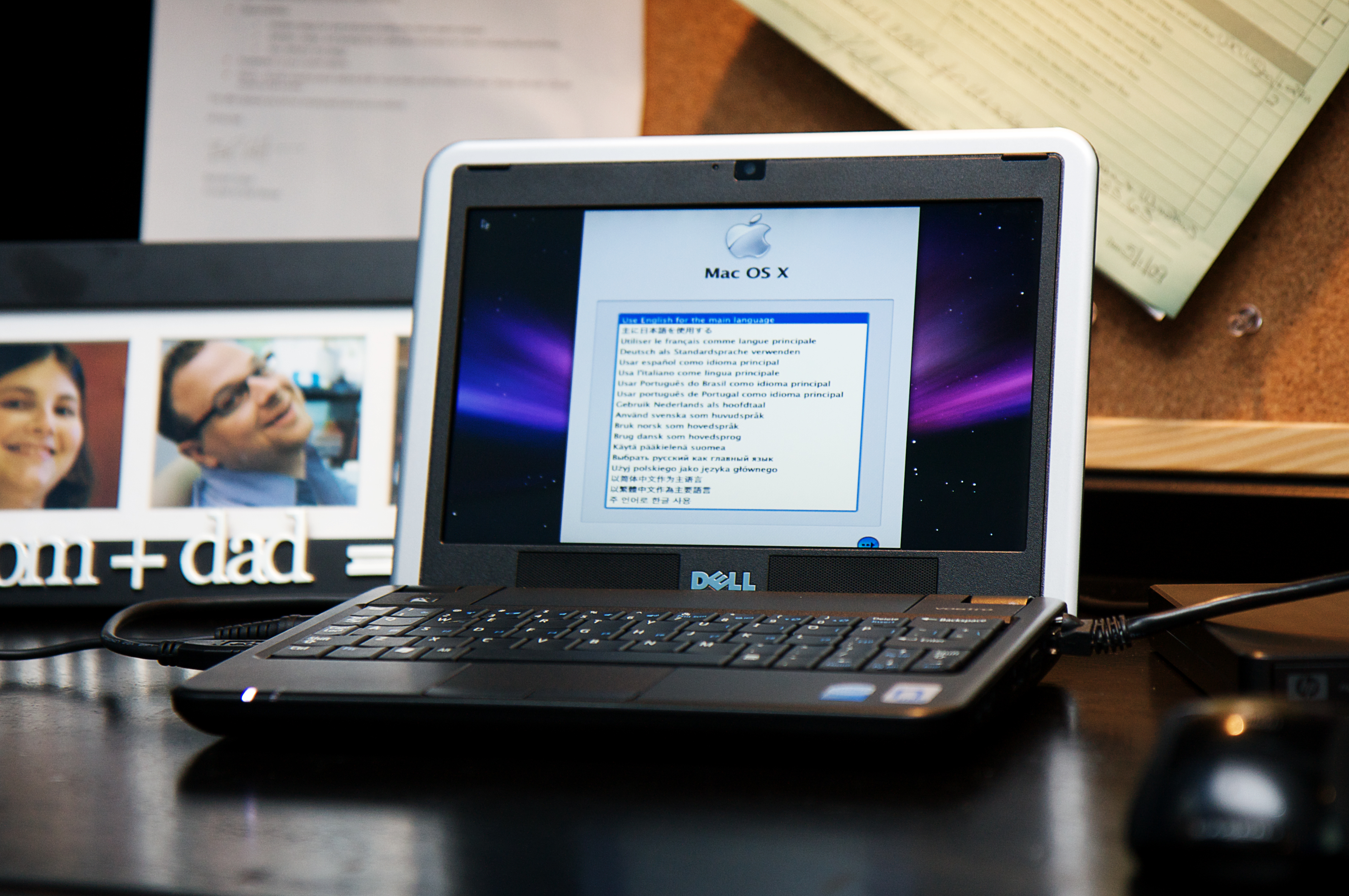
Vostro A90n

The Vostro A90 is Dell's 8.9" business netbook with similar platform as Dell Mini 9. The A90n offers Ubuntu Linux while the A90 offers Windows XP.

- CPU: Intel Atom N270
- Display: 8.9" WSVGA (1024×600) TN
- Memory: 1 GB DDR2 SDRAM @ 533 MHz
- Optical Drive: None
- Graphics: Integrated Intel GMA 950
- Storage: 16 GB solid state drive
- Wireless: Wireless 802.11g card
- Webcam: Integrated 0.3 MP
- Battery: 4-cell (35 WHr) lithium-ion
- Starting Price: $219 (Vostro A90n), $309 (Vostro A90)

=== Vostro V13 ===
The Vostro V13 is Dell's 13.3" business ultraportable with targeted at consumers looking for a budget business ultraportable. The Vostro V13 has a chassis design similar to the Dell Adamo, but it is very cheap at $449, though it ships with Ubuntu and clocks in at a 1.4 GHz Intel solo processor. The processor in the V13 cannot be customized, but the memory can. The base configuration ships with Ubuntu Linux version 9.04, but higher-end configurations ship with Windows 7.

- CPU: Intel Celeron M 743, Core 2 Solo SU3500 or Core 2 Duo SU7300
- Display: 13.3" LED-backlit widescreen (1366×768)
- Memory: 2 GB or 4 GB DDR3 SDRAM @ 1066 MHz
- Optical Drive: external 8X DVD+/-RW drive (option)
- Graphics: Integrated Intel GMA X4500MHD
- Storage: 1x SATA (250 GB (5400 RPM), 250 GB (7200 RPM) w/data encryption or 320 GB or 500 GB (7200 RPM))
- Wireless: Dell Wireless 1397 802.11b/g or Intel PRO/Wireless 5100 802.11b/g/n
- Webcam: Integrated 1.3 MP webcam
- Battery: 6-cell (30 Whr) lithium ion
- Starting Price: $449

=== Vostro 3300 ===
The Vostro 3300 is a laptop with a 13.3 inch widescreen display aimed at small business. Dell offers an Intel Core i3 or i5 processor with up to 6 GB DDR3 RAM. The chassis is made of aluminum. The operating system installed is Windows 7 32-bit/64-bit with an XP downgrade as an option. Discrete graphics is an option, and pricing starts at $599. This model has been discontinued by Dell.

- CPU: Intel Core i3-350M, Core i5-430M, Core i5-450M or Core i5-520M
- Display: 13.3" LED display (1366×768) with anti-glare
- Memory: 2 GB, 3 GB, 4 GB, or 6 GB DDR3 @ 1066 MHz (up to 8 GB supported)
- Optical Drive: Dual-Layer 8X DVD+/-RW Drive
- Graphics: Intel GMA HD or Nvidia GeForce 310M, 512 MB
- Security Hardware: Fingerprint reader w/DigitalPersona software (optional)
- Storage: 1x SATA (250 GB @7200 RPM (encrypted drive optional), 320 GB (7200 RPM), 500 GB (7200 RPM))
- Wireless: Dell Wireless 1520 b/g/n
- Webcam: Integrated 2.0 MP webcam
- Battery: 4-cell lithium-ion
- Starting Price: $599

=== Vostro 3400 ===
The Vostro 3400 is a laptop with a 14-inch display aimed at small business. It offers updated Core i processors and larger batteries. Pricing starts at $549. Operating system options are the ones offered with the Vostro 3300.

- CPU: Intel Core i3-370M or Core i5-450M
- Display: 14" LED display (1366×768) with anti-glare
- Memory: 3 or 4 GB DDR3 @ 1066 MHz (up to 8 GB supported)
- Optical Drive: Dual-Layer 8X DVD+/-RW Drive
- Graphics: Intel GMA HD or Nvidia GeForce 310M, 512 MB
- Security Hardware: Fingerprint reader w/DigitalPersona software
- Storage: 1x SATA 250 GB (7200 RPM) or 320 GB (7200 RPM)
- Wireless: Dell Wireless 1520 b/g/n
- Webcam: Integrated 1.0 MP (720p HD) webcam
- Battery: 6-cell or 9-cell lithium-ion
- Starting Price: $549

=== Vostro 3500 ===
The Vostro 3500 is a laptop with a 15.6-inch display aimed at small business. Operating system options are the ones offered with the Vostro 3300. In some countries Ubuntu can be chosen as the operating system. Vostro 3500 production is discontinued.

- CPU: Intel Core i3-350M, Core i5-450M, i5-460M, i5-520M or Core i7-640M
- Display: 15.6" LED display (1366×768) with anti-glare
- Memory: 2, 3, or 4 GB @ 1066 MHz (up to 8 GB supported)
- Chipset: Intel HM57
- Optical Drive: Dual-Layer 8X DVD+/-RW Drive
- Graphics: Intel GMA HD
- Security Hardware: Fingerprint reader w/DigitalPersona software
- Storage: 1x SATA 320 GB, or 500 GB (7200 RPM)
- Wireless: Dell Wireless 1520 Wireless-N Half Mini Card (a/b/n = Wi-Fi 4)
- Webcam: Integrated 2.0 MP webcam

=== Vostro 3550 ===
The Vostro 3550 is a laptop with a 15.6-inch display aimed at small business. Operating system options are the same as those offered with the Vostro 3350.

- CPU: Intel Core i3-2310M, Core i5-2410M or Core i7-2620M
- Display: 15.6" LED display (1366×768) with anti-glare
- Memory: PC3-10600 CL9 1.5 V modules - 2, 4 or 8 GB @ 1333 MHz (up to 8 GB officially, but works with 16 GB as well)
- Chipset: Intel HM67
- Optical Drive: Dual-Layer 8X DVD+/-RW Drive
- Graphics: Intel HD 3000 + optional ATI Radeon HD6630 (up to 1 GB VRAM)
- Security Hardware: Fingerprint reader w/DigitalPersona software
- Storage: 1x SATA 250 GB, 320 GB, or 500 GB (7200 RPM)
- Wireless: Intel Wireless N-1030 b/g/n
- Webcam: Integrated 2.0 MP webcam (UVC video)
- Battery: 6-cell lithium-ion

=== Vostro 3560 ===
The Vostro 3560 is Dell's 15.6" business notebook.

- CPU: Core i5-3210M, Core i5-3230M or Core i7-3612QM
- Display: 15.6" LED display (1920×1080) TN
- Memory: 4 GB, 8 GB DDR3 SDRAM @ 1600 MHz
- Chipset: Intel HM77
- Optical Drive: DVD+/-RW DualLayer
- Graphics: Intel HD 4000 + optional ATI Radeon HD7670M (up to 1 GB VRAM)
- Storage: 1x SATA 500 GB (7200 RPM)
- Wireless: Intel Centrino Wireless-N 2230 (b/g/n = Wi-Fi 4)
- Webcam: Integrated 1.3 MP webcam
- Battery: 6-cell lithium-ion

=== Vostro 3700 ===
The Vostro 3700 is a laptop with a 17.3-inch display aimed at small business. Pricing starts at $629. An Intel Core i7 processor is an option on the Vostro 3700, the only Vostro 3000 series laptop to offer this processor. Operating system options are the same as those offered with the Vostro 3300.

- CPU: Intel Core i3-350M, Core i5-450M, i5-520M, or Core i7-720QM
- Display: 17.3" LED display (1600×900) with anti-glare
- Memory: 2 GB, 3 GB, 4 GB DDR3 @ 1066 MHz (up to 8 GB supported)
- Optical Drive: Dual-Layer 8X DVD+/-RW Drive
- Graphics: Intel GMA HD or Nvidia GeForce 310M (512 MB) or Nvidia GeForce 330M GT (1024 MB)
- Security Hardware: Fingerprint reader w/DigitalPersona software
- Storage: 1× SATA (HDD 250 GB 7200 RPM, 320 GB 7200 RPM, 500 GB 7200 RPM)
- Wireless: Dell Wireless 1520 b/g/n
- Webcam: Integrated 2.0 MP webcam
- Battery: 6-cell lithium-ion

== Desktops ==
=== First generation ===
==== General ====
- Vostro 200 Slim Tower – Released 10 July, 2007. Uses Windows Vista or XP.
- Vostro 200 Mini Tower
- Vostro 230 Mini Tower – Uses Intel Dual Core, Core 2 Duo and Core 2 Quad processors

==== Phase 2 Release ====
- Vostro 400 Mini Tower – Antec EarthWatts EA380 (same case as Vostro 200 Mini Tower)
- Vostro 410 Tower – Uses the G33 chipset and features 3 external 5.25" drive bays.

=== Second generation ===
- Vostro 220S Slim Tower – Updated DVD/CD/Blu-ray slot case
- Vostro 220 Mini Tower
- Vostro 420 Tower – Uses the G45 chipset.

=== Third generation ===
- Vostro 230 Mini Tower/Desktop/Small Form Factor Desktop – Uses Intel Pentium/Core 2 Duo processors
- Vostro 430 Mini Tower – Uses Nehalem Intel Core i5 and Core i7 processors.

=== Fourth generation ===
- Vostro 260 Mini Tower – uses Sandy Bridge based Intel Pentium/Core i3/i5 processors.
- Vostro 460 Mini Tower – uses Sandy Bridge based Intel Core i5/i7 processors.

=== Fifth generation ===
- Vostro 270 Mini Tower – uses Ivy Bridge based Intel Pentium/Core i3/i5 processors.
- Vostro 470 Mini Tower – uses Ivy Bridge based Intel Core i5/i7 processors.

=== Sixth generation ===
- Dell Vostro 3900 (2015) – uses Haswell processors. Windows 8.1.

=== Seventh generation ===
- Dell Vostro 3268 - uses Kaby Lake processors.

=== Dell Vostro 3468 (2016) ===
(Windows 10, Ubuntu).

==== Dell Vostro 3470/3471 Desktop Tower (2016) ====
Sources: (Windows 10, Ubuntu).

- Width: 3.65" (92.7 mm)
- Depth: 11.54" (293 mm)
- Height: 11.42" (290 mm)
- Starting weight: 9.6 lb (4.35 kg)
- Chipset: Intel B360
- Processor: Intel Core i3-8100 (4-Core/4-Thread, 6 MB Cache, 3.6 GHz)
- Operating system: Windows 10 Professional 64-bit English
- Memory: 4 GB DDR4 2400 MHz (minimum); 32 GB DDR4 2400 MHz (maximum)
- Hard drive: 3.5" 1 TB 7200RPM SATA Hard Drive
- Bluetooth: 4.0, 2.4 GHz, 1x1
- Graphics: Intel® UHD Graphics 630 with shared graphics memory
- Starting price: $389.00-$739.00

=== Dell Vostro 3668 (2016) ===
(Windows 10, Ubuntu).

==== Dell Vostro 3670/3671 Desktop Tower (2016) ====
Sources: (Windows 10, Ubuntu).

- Width: 6.3" (160 mm)
- Depth: 11.39" (289.4 mm)
- Height: 14.71" (373.7 mm)
- Starting weight: 11.6 lb (5.27 kg)
- Chipset: Intel B360
- Processor: Intel Core i3-9100 (minimum); Core i7-9700 (maximum)
- Operating system: Windows 10 Professional 64-bit English
- Memory: 4 GB DDR4 2666 MHz (minimum); 32 GB DDR4 2666 MHz (maximum)
- Hard drive: 256 GB M.2 PCIe NVMe Solid State Drive + 1 TB 7200 rpm 3.5-inch SATA hard drive
- Bluetooth: 4.0, 2.4 GHz, 1x1
- Graphics: Intel® UHD Graphics 630; Nvidia GeForce GTX 1050Ti with 4 GB GDDR5 Graphics Memory
- Starting price: $389.00-$579.00

=== Ninth generation ===
==== Dell Vostro 5090 Desktop ====
- Processor: 9th Gen Intel Core i7-9700 (8-Core, 12 MB Cache, up to 4.7 GHz with Intel Turbo Boost Technology)
- Operating system: Windows 10 Pro 64-bit English
- Memory: 8 GB DDR4 2666 MHz (minimum);
- Graphics: Nvidia GeForce GTX 1660Ti 6 GB GDDR6
- Starting price: $699.00-$1349.00
- Dimensions: Mini-tower version of Vostro 3000 series, i.e., no expansion slots

=== Other desktops ===
- Dell Vostro A100
- Dell Vostro A180
- Dell Vostro 270, 270S; 2012-2013
