= Enthusiast System Architecture =

Royalty-free protocol

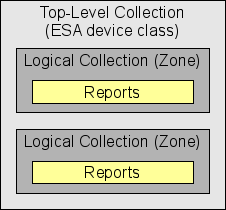
ESA diagram.

The Enthusiast System Architecture (ESA) specification is a royalty-free protocol for two-way communication of PC components. Announced in 2007, ESA is used for monitoring temperature of computer hardware components such as the computer case and power supply unit. The first and last official release of the ESA specification is version 1.0, released in 2007. The ESA USB specification was created by a joint venture between Microsoft, Nvidia, Logitech and several other companies. The protocol remains open and royalty-free; but, no manufacturers are currently utilizing its specification at this time. The last known devices to utilize the ESA specifications were the Dell XPS 730x and Alienware Area-51 ALX computer systems that utilized the ESA specification to control its fans, LEDs, and motorized doors as well as the monitoring of available Water cooling systems such as the Dell XPS 730x's Dell H_{2}Ceramic Cooling System.

The ESA specification is built around the current USB human interface device class specification and ESA was sent to the USB Implementers Forum HID subcommittee for discussion and approval in early 2007. The USBIF approved and inserted the ESA specification into the USB HID specifications as an extension in late 2007 (reference paper needed). All ESA-certified devices must pass USB 2.0 logo compliance. Readings of temperature, voltage, current, power, activity level, water level, status, position and so on can be monitored via USB Implementers Forum specifications. At the time of release, these devices could be controlled and monitored via the nTune application, while operating mode, voltages, rpm while also allowing these devices to be adjusted in the utility.

ESA devices have a microcontroller that integrates a USB 2.0-compliant full-speed device controller and ESA-compliant hardware components connects to the motherboard via a USB cable. ESA-compliant hardware components are seen as 'Collections'. Within the collections there are 'Zones'. Sensors and controls are organized into zones.

Only one software implementation exists; it is Nvidia's proprietary "System Tools with ESA Support" which only works on nForce-based motherboards and only runs on Windows.

== See also ==
- System monitor
- Nvidia System Tools
