= H2Ceramic cooling =

Computer cooling product

H_{2}Ceramic cooling (also called H_{2}C or Hot-to-Cold) is a computer cooling product offered as an option in some of Dell's XPS desktop computers, advertised specifically as facilitating CPU overclocking. H_{2}C is a two-stage Liquid/Thermoelectric (TEC) hybrid cooling system that combines a liquid-to-air heat exchanger (much like a liquid radiator), a thermoelectric fluid chiller, and control circuitry to optimize CPU cooling with minimal power.

The components are delivered as a single unit designed to last a minimum of 5 years without service or liquid refilling. The XPS 710 H_{2}C and Dell XPS 720 H_{2}C featured a design where all components were mounted in a single plastic chassis and which only cooled the CPU. This design only matched motherboards with a very specific CPU socket location. It was later replaced by a new and more flexible design featuring a separate pump unit which made it much easier to fit a broader range of motherboards with different CPU socket locations. The new design allowed the unit to cool the motherboard chipset as well.

== Components ==
The front of the unit (facing the front of the PC case) has a 120 mm Radiator which is the primary heat exchanger. It is cooled by a fan. After passing the radiator, the cooling liquid moves through a thermoelectric fluid chiller consisting of a liquid cooling block with two Peltier plates. The pump includes an integrated reservoir and spring-loaded floor, to keep the unit pressurized while still allowing small amounts of liquid to bleed out over time.

The first version of the H2C cooled the CPU only. Later versions cooled both the chipset and CPU using a design with automotive rubber tubing to allow greater flexibility in the placement of the cooling plates.

== Pump, fan and TEC control ==
Rather than having the control mechanism integrated into the H_{2}C unit, the pump, fans and TEC are controlled separately by a Dell daughterboard, the Master Control Board (MCB). The MCB uses Enthusiast System Architecture (ESA) to monitor and control the pump, fans and TEC (in addition to controlling the XPS LED lights, other fans, and sensors). To avoid condensation the MCB firmware limits the use of the TECs and turns them on only when the CPU is under heavy load. The TECs are turned off when the CPU is idle or when the CPU temperature is the same as the ambient temperature (measured by the MCB).

The H_{2}C system cannot be reused in another computer case without the MCB or custom-made control circuits to take its place.

== Performance ==
According to Dell, the cooling efficiency of H_{2}C contributes to PC systems that are cooler in over-clocked mode and potentially quieter in normal operating mode. By cooling the CPU below what is possible with traditional forced-air convection or water cooling systems, but preventing the temperature from falling below ambient room temperature, H_{2}C is advertised as extending CPU life while eliminating the risk of humidity condensation.

While Dell continues to offer liquid cooling in their Alienware gaming computers, they have discontinued use of the H_{2}C technology with the XPS 730X being the last model to utilize it. Liquid cooled Alienware computers are not equipped with TECs and do not require a daughterboard (MCB) for the cooling system.

== See also ==
- Front Side Bus
- Overvolting
- Benchmark (computing)
