= Dell Studio =

Line of computers by Dell

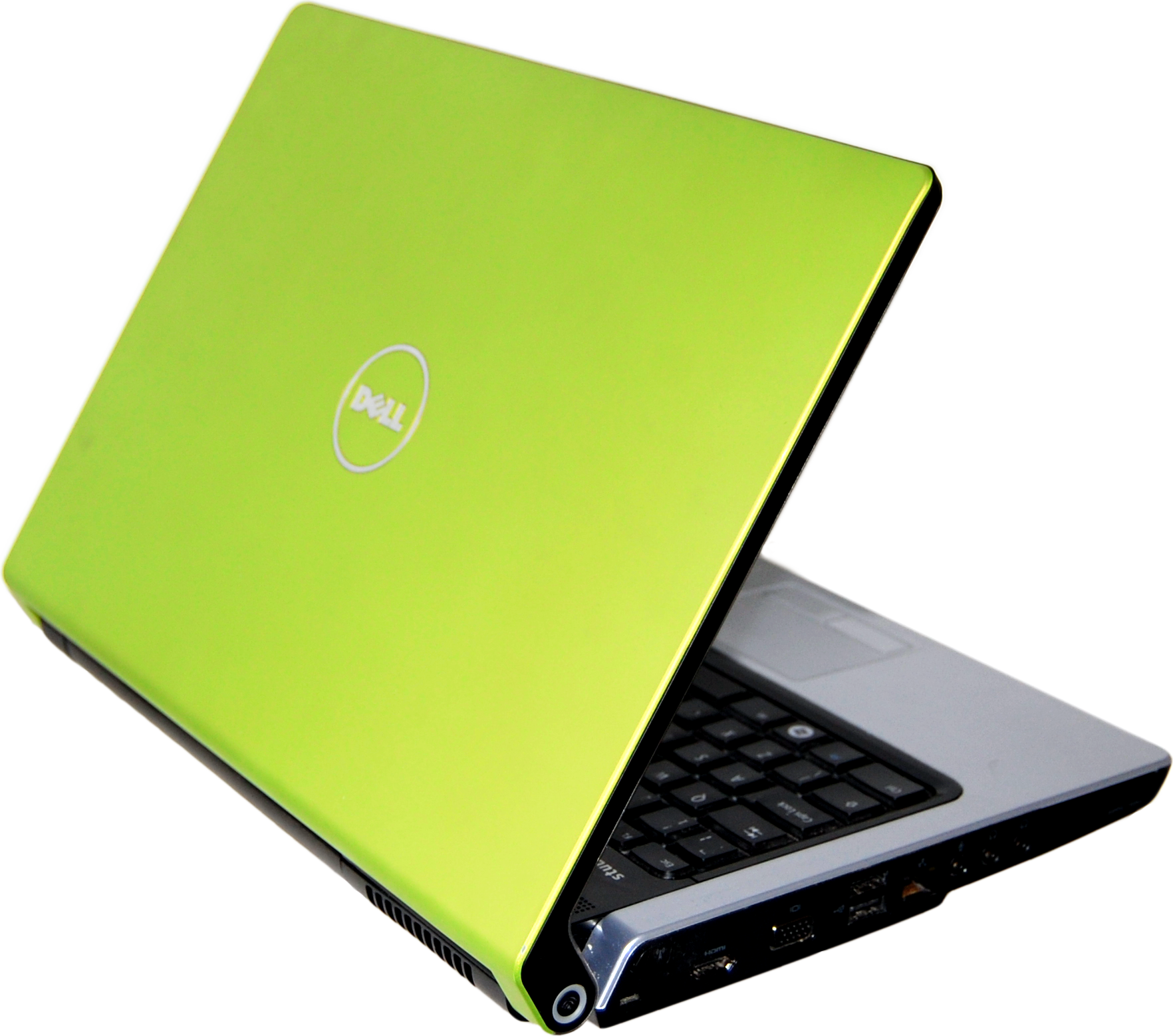
- Dell Studio 1535
- Developer: Dell
- Manufacturer: Dell
- Type: Laptop, Desktop
- Released: 2008; 18 years ago
- Discontinued: 2011
- Operating system: Windows
- CPU: Intel, AMD
- Graphics: Intel, AMD, Nvidia
- Marketing target: Consumer
- Related: Inspiron, XPS

Dell Studio is a discontinued family of consumer-oriented mid-range personal computers produced by Dell. They sat between Dell's Inspiron and XPS consumer lines in terms of price and specification. They differed from Dell's lower-end Inspiron models by offering slot-loading optical drives; media keys; more cover design options; faster processor options; HDMI and eSATA ports; LED-backlit screens; and backlit keyboards.

At the launch in June 2008, the Studio started in the form of two laptop models, the Studio 15 and Studio 17. This was followed a month later by the Studio Hybrid, a compact legacy-free desktop named for its use of laptop components. If purchased online, many customizable colors, designs, and features were available, including a fingerprint scanner in some countries.

On June 18, 2010, Dell stopped selling the Studio Hybrid, and as of May 2011, Dell also discontinued the Studio line of laptops.

== Laptops ==
=== Studio 14 series ===
The Studio 14 series was a range of 14" laptops.

- Studio 1450 (2009): Intel Pentium and Core 2 Duo processors; DDR3 memory; and standard Intel GMA X4500MHD integrated graphics.
- Studio 1457 (2009): Intel Core i7 quad-core processors; DDR3 memory; and standard ATI Mobility Radeon HD 4530 graphics.
- Studio 1458 (2010): Intel Core i3/i5/i7 quad-core and dual-core processors; DDR3 memory; and standard Intel HD Graphics or ATI Mobility Radeon HD 4530 or 5450.

==== Studio 14z (2009) ====
The Studio 14z, was released in 2009, deviating from the normal 14 series model numbers. It Lacked an optical drive; came with an Intel Pentium T4200, Core 2 T6400, Core 2 P8600, Core 2 T9550, or Core 2 T9900 processor; an NVIDIA GeForce 9400M video card; and used DDR3 RAM.

=== Studio 15 series ===
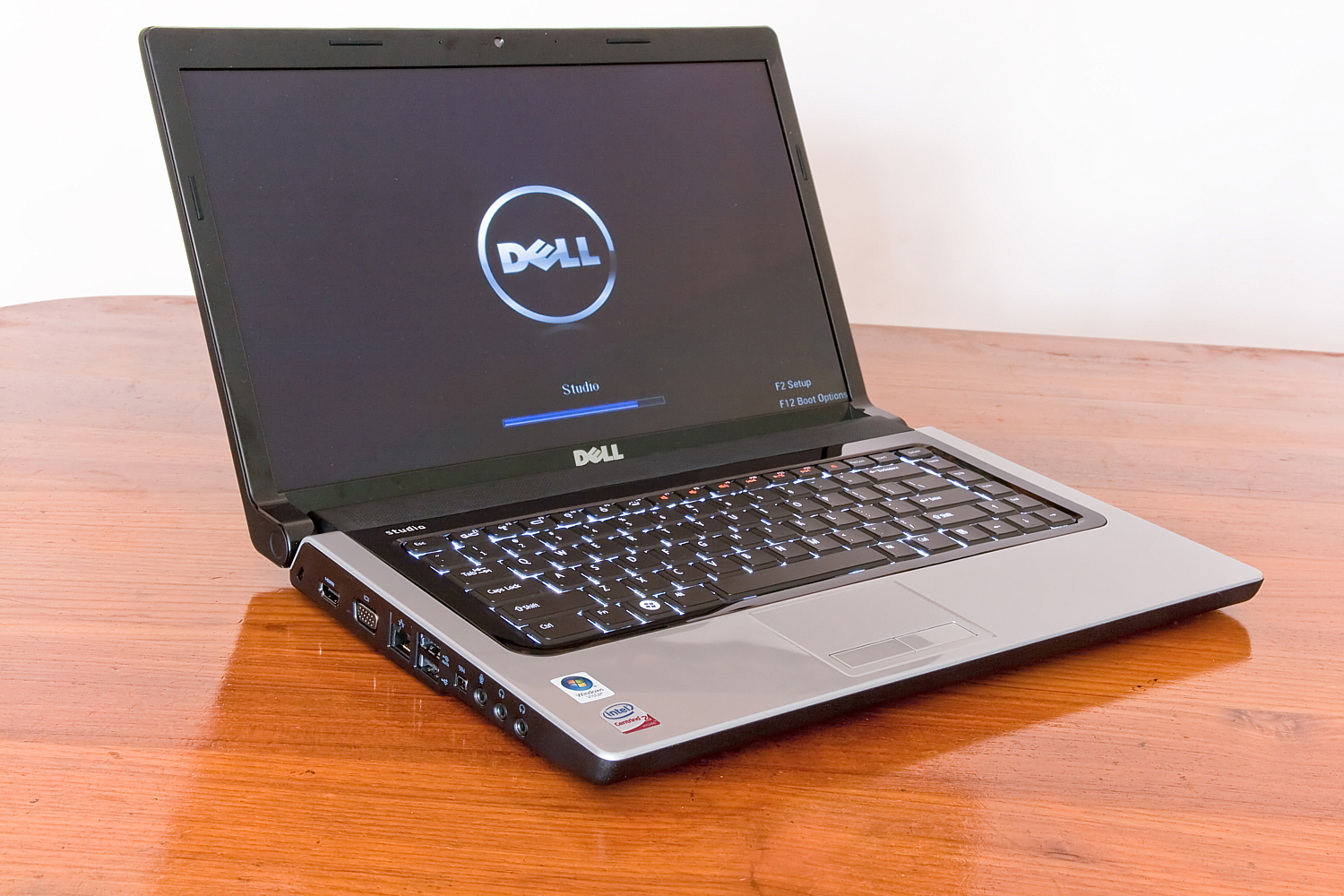
Dell Studio 15 (1555) with 15.6 in 16:9 aspect ratio widescreen & backlit keyboard.

The Studio 15 was the mainstream series of the Studio laptop line. It had many options and features that changed over time, including processors ranging from low-end Pentium Dual Core processors up to quad-core i7 processors. Some designs, like the Studio 1537, were available in a variety of colors, such as orange, red, pink, lime green, black, and a variety of creative patterns that were incorporated into the computer's top and could not be changed by the user. All models except the 1537, 1557, and 1569 shipped standard with Intel integrated graphics.

The 153x models came standard with touch capacitive media and eject buttons; a slot-loading DVD drive; and an optional fingerprint reader. Both the touch capacitive buttons and the optional fingerprint reader were removed from later models. The fingerprint reader was replaced in later models with a facial recognition webcam, for those with the desire to log on without the need to type a password.

- Studio 1535 (2008): Intel Pentium and Core 2 Duo processors; 800 MHz DDR2 RAM; and the option of the ATI Mobility Radeon HD 3450 256 MB video card.
- Studio 1536 (2008): AMD Turion X2 processors; 800 MHz DDR2 RAM; and the option of the ATI Mobility Radeon HD 3450 video card.
- Studio 1537 (2008): Offered various upgrades over the other 153x models, including up to 4 GB of RAM from the factory (upgradable to 8 GB); a faster Intel Core 2 Duo processor; a backlit keyboard; integrated Bluetooth; a dedicated ATI Mobility Radeon HD 34xx Series 256 MB video card; and a 2-megapixel webcam with facial recognition.
- Studio 1555 (2009): Newer Core 2 Duo and Pentium processors; 800 MHz DDR2 RAM; and an ATI Mobility Radeon HD 4570 video card with 256 MB or 512 MB of dedicated memory.
- Studio 1557 (2009): Intel Core i7 quad-core processor; 1066 MHz or 1333 MHz DDR3 RAM; and standard ATI Mobility Radeon HD 4570 video card with 512 MB of video memory.
- Studio 1558 (2010): Intel Core i3, i5 and i7 processors; 1066 MHz DDR3 RAM; and either an ATI Mobility Radeon HD 4570 video card with 512 MB of dedicated memory, or a 5470 with 1 GB of dedicated memory.
- Studio 1569 (2010): Intel Core i5-430M 2.26 GHz processor; 4 GB 1066 MHz DDR3 RAM; and Intel integrated graphics, or 512 MB ATI Mobility Radeon HD 4570 video card.

=== Studio 17 series ===
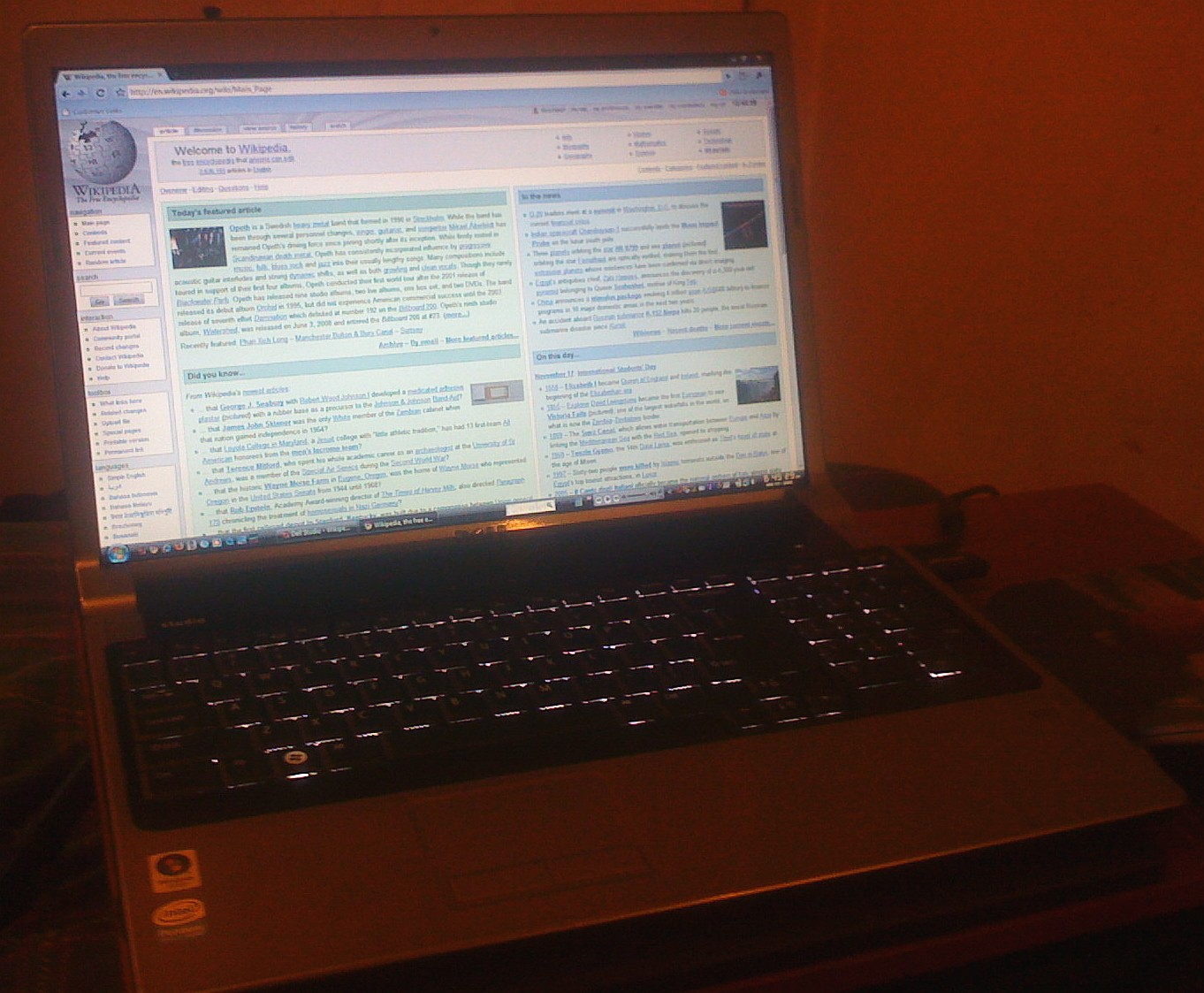
Dell Studio 17, featuring a full number pad and a backlit keyboard

The Studio 17 series was a range of 17" laptops.

- Studio 1735 (2008): Used the Intel Santa Rosa platform
- Studio 1736 (2008): Used the AMD Turion 64 processor
- Studio 1737 (2008): Used the Intel Montevina platform
- Studio 1745 (2009): Used the Intel Calpella platform, featuring a Core i7 processor and DDR3 memory, plus JBL 2.1 speakers (2 x 1.5 watt and 3 watt subwoofer)
- Studio 17 Touch (2009): Featured Windows 7 multi-touch on a capacitive display)
- Studio 1747 and 1749 (2010): Same as 1745

=== Studio XPS ===
In 2009 some Studio models were released with naming that included the Dell XPS moniker, intended to distinguish them as being at the higher end of the Studio range. This included the 13" Studio XPS 13 model M1340, and 16" Studio XPS 16 models M1640, M1645, and M1647.

== Desktops ==
=== Studio Hybrid (2008) ===
The Studio Hybrid, released in 2008 was the first desktop model in the Studio range. It was a miniature desktop form similar to the HP Pavilion Slimline series of desktops, and Apple's Mac Mini, and supposedly was Dell's most energy-efficient desktop. It was named after the fact that it used components primarily intended for laptops. It was enclosed in a plastic interchangeable sleeve which was available in various colors, including a $130 premium version made out of bamboo. It came with a slot-loading DVD-RW drive, but for around $200 extra it could be upgraded to a Blu-Ray drive that could also burn DVDs, along with the Broadcom Crystal HD card needed to accelerate the video (Using Dell Media Direct Software). The board had an integrated Intel X3100 graphics chipset, which while unsuitable for playing graphics-intensive video games, was adequate for common tasks. They initially came with Windows Vista, but users were offered a Windows 7 upgrade at no extra cost from Microsoft. The last units to be sold came with Windows 7 but with the maximum RAM upgrade of 4GB they could easily run Windows 8 or 10 without a problem. An included stand could be configured to stand up the computer either vertically or horizontally. The appropriate "Hybrid" logo would light up depending on how the machine is orientated.

=== Studio 540 (MT) and Studio Slim 540s (ST) (2008) ===
The Studio 540 (chassis code MT) and Studio Slim 540s (ST) were released in September 2008, 'rounding out' their Studio line. Each was offered with a choice of Core 2 Duo or Core 2 Quad processors; up to 8GB of RAM; and integrated 7.1 audio. They used the same case style as Dell's Inspiron 530 and 530s desktops but in a black color.

The 540 (MT) had "two 5.25" external drive bays, one external 3.5" bay, and two internal 3.5" drive bays", along with "one PCI-e x16 slot, two PCI-e x1 slots and one PCI slot". The 540s (ST) was identical with the exception of having a single 5.25" external bay.

Extensibility included 6x USB 2.0 ports (4 front, 2 back); a FireWire (IEEE 1394) port (two on the 540 model); S/PDIF output; HDMI and VGA output; Gigabit Ethernet; a 16-in-1 media card reader on the 540 model, 19-in-1 on the 540s; and used a 350W power supply for the 540, and smaller 250W for the 540s. Optional upgrades included Discrete ATI graphics; Blu-Ray ROM optical drives; a TV tuner; 802.11n Wi-Fi connectivity; wireless keyboards and mice; and 64-bit versions of Windows Vista.

=== Studio XPS ===
Like the Studio XPS laptops, a line of desktops were released, starting in 2008, combining the Studio and XPS brand names, denoting higher-end Studio models.

This included the following:

- Studio XPS 435/435T (2008)
- Studio XPS 435MT (2008)
- Studio XPS 8000 and 9000 (2009)
- Studio XPS 7100, 8100 and 9100 (2010)

=== Studio One 19 (model 1909) ===
Released on April 28, 2009 in the United States, the Studio One 19 was a 19-inch all-in-one desktop computer. It was a lower-end alternative to Dell's XPS One 20 and 24. The chassis design was highly reminiscent of Dell's SX2210 21.5 inch LCD monitor. The chassis could be customized with five different colors. There was also a touch-screen option.

=== Specifications ===
Model	Studio Hybrid	540 and 540s	Studio One 19	Studio XPS 435T
Released	July 29, 2008	September 23, 2008	April 28, 2009	November 2008
CPU	Intel Pentium Dual-Core T4300, Intel Core 2 Duo T6500, T6600, T8100, T9300 or T9500	Intel Pentium Dual-Core E5200, can be customized up to an Intel Core 2 Quad Q9650 (both models)	Intel Pentium Dual-Core E5200 or E5400, Intel Core 2 Duo E7400, E7500, E8300, E8400, E8500 or Intel Core 2 Quad Q8200 or Q8400. With the latest BIOS, higher-end LGA775 CPU can be used, such as the Q9550 and Q9650. Because this motherboard has an LGA775 socket, the i3, i5 and i7 processors do not fit because those use different processor sockets.	Intel Core i7-920, 940 or 950
Memory	2, 3 or 4 GB shared dual-channel DDR2 SDRAM at 800 MHz	2 GB dual-channel DDR2 SDRAM, upgradable up to 8 GB	2 GB, 3 GB or 4 GB of shared dual channel DDR2 SDRAM at 667 MHz	4 or 8 GB dual-channel DDR3 SDRAM at 1066 MHz; or 3, 6, 12 or 24 GB triple-channel DDR3 SDRAM at 1066 MHz
Chipset	Intel GM965	Intel G45	Nvidia MCP 7A	Intel X58 Extreme
GPU	Integrated Intel GMA X3100 graphics	Integrated Intel GMA 4500HD graphics (both) (Studio desktop can be customized with up to an ATI Radeon HD 4670 or Nvidia GeForce 9800 GT; Studio Slim can be customized with an ATI Radeon HD 4350)	Integrated Nvidia GeForce 9200 or 9400	ATI Radeon HD 4350, HD 4670 or HD 4850
Display			18.5" widescreen, 1366×768 resolution (optional touchscreen)	
Hard drive	160, 250 or 320 GB SATA (5400 RPM)		320, 500, 640 or 750 GB SATA (7200 RPM)	500, 640, 750 GB or 1 TB SATA (7200 RPM, 16 MB cache); 640 GB, 1 TB or 1.28 TB SATA (7200 RPM in RAID 0); or 500 GB or 640 GB SATA (7200 RPM in RAID 1)
Optical drive	8× slot-load dual-layer DVD+/-RW drive ($200 Blu-ray drive upgrade with Broadcom Crystal HD card offered)	16 DVD+/-RW (both) (Studio desktop can be customized with up to one Blu-ray Disc burner and one DVD+/-RW drive; Studio Slim desktop can be customized up to a Blu-ray Disc burner)	16× slot-load dual-layer DVD+/-RW or 2× slot-load Blu-ray Disc combo drive	16× tray-load dual-layer DVD+/-RW, 2× tray-load Blu-ray Disc combo drive or Blu-ray Disc burner (single and dual-drive configurations)
Webcam			1.3 megapixel webcam	
Wi-Fi	Dell Wireless 1505 802.11n mini-card (optional)		Internal 802.11b/g or 802.11n wireless networking	Dell Wireless 1505 802.11n with external antenna
Other	External 56K fax modem	Both desktops have integrated 7.1 channel audio, but the Studio desktop can be customized with a Sound Blaster X-Fi Xtreme Gamer audio card	6 USB ports, 1 FireWire port, 1 Fast Ethernet port, 1 audio line output, 1 7-in-1 memory card reader, 1 headphone jack and 1 microphone jack	8 USB ports, 1 eSATA port, 1 FireWire port, 1 Gbit Ethernet port, 1 audio line output, 1 back L/R surround sound connector, 1 subwoofer connector, 1 S/PDIF connector, 1 19-in-1 memory card reader, 1 headphone jack and 1 microphone jack

== Issues ==
According to users on the Dell user forum, the Studio 15 (older 1535, 1536, and 1537 models) and Studio 17 (1735, 1736, and 1737) frequently encountered errors with the touch-sensitive controls. The eject or start buttons for Dell MediaDirect stayed lit for a few minutes after the unit was powered on - resulting in a loss of functionality from the rest of the buttons.

Users have additionally reported issues with the Studio 1555 and Studio 1557's video cards. This was later found to be the effects of a video driver problem.

The 1555, 1557 and 1558 models have been known to overheat during certain activities - namely 3D graphics related applications and games. The design of the heatsink and fan prevented some basic approaches to fix this issue. By combining the heatsink and fan components, users were prevented from cleaning blocked heatsink vents or from replacing thermal paste - furthering the overheating problems.
