= Dell XPS desktop computers =

Line of high-performance desktop computers by Dell

Dell XPS desktops
- Developer: Dell
- Manufacturer: Dell
- Product family: XPS
- Type: Desktop
- Released: 1993; 33 years ago (as Dimension sub-brand); 2008 (as separate product family)
- Operating system: Windows, Linux
- CPU: Intel, AMD, Qualcomm
- Graphics: Intel/AMD/Qualcomm (integrated); ATI/AMD/Nvidia (discrete)
- Marketing target: Consumer
- Related: Inspiron, Vostro, Latitude
- Website: www.dell.com/xps

XPS desktops are a family of consumer-oriented high-end desktop computers under the XPS brand, manufactured by Dell Inc..

== Early models ==
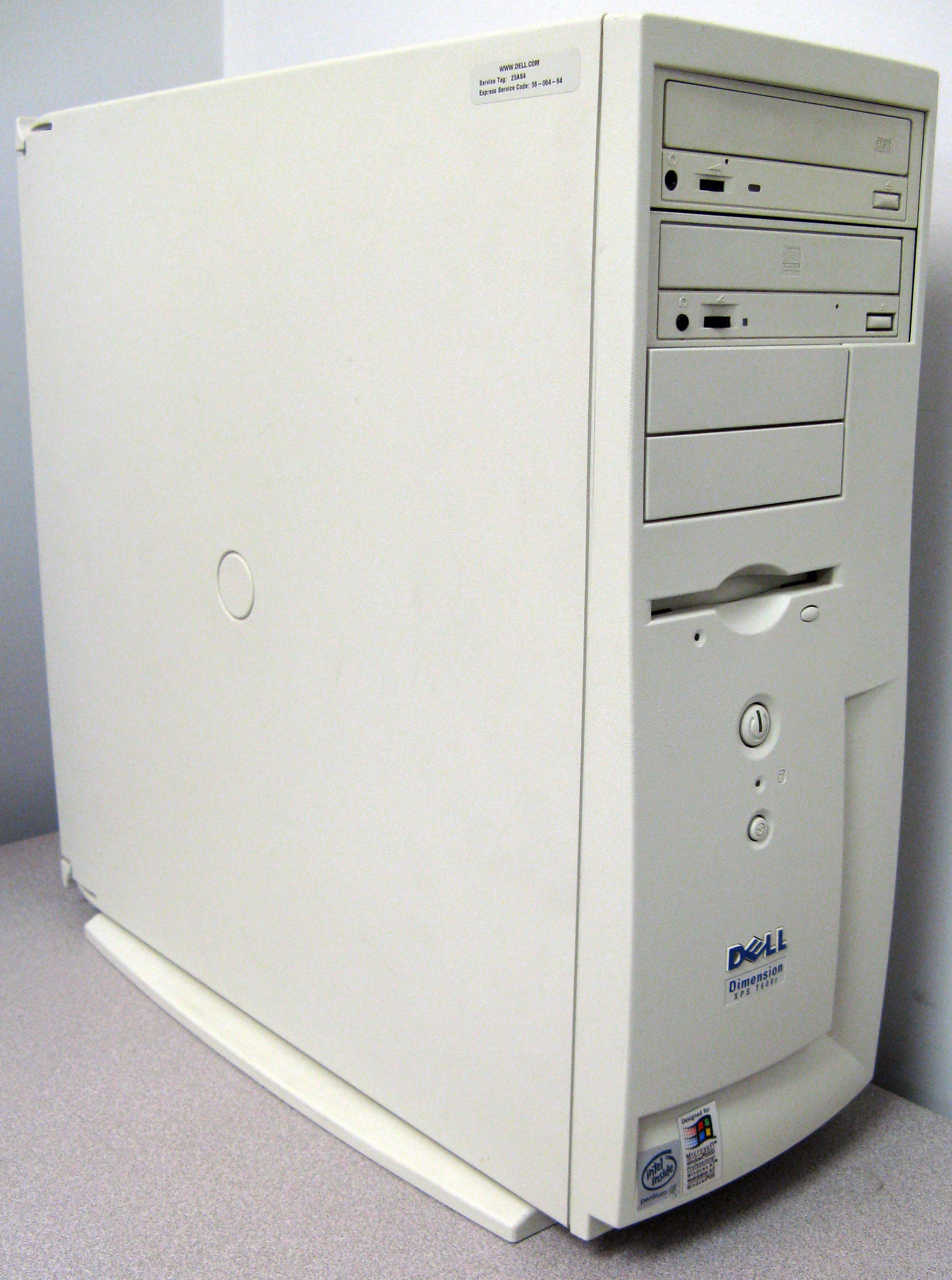
Dell XPS T600R

=== XPS Hxxx series (1996/97) ===
A system that came out circa 1996/97. It contained an Intel Pentium II (Klamath) CPU, EDO DRAM, and an i440FX chipset.

=== XPS Dxxx series (1997) ===
A system that came out in 1997. It contained an Intel Pentium II (Klamath) CPU, SDRAM, and an i440LX chipset.

=== XPS Rxxx series (1998) ===
A system that was introduced in 1998. It contained an Intel Pentium II (Deschutes) CPU, SDRAM, and an i440BX chipset.

=== XPS Txxx series (1999) ===
A system that was introduced in 1999. It contained an Intel Pentium III CPU, SDRAM, and an i440BX chipset.

=== XPS Bxxx series (2000) ===
A system that was introduced in 2000. It contained an Intel Pentium III CPU, 128 MB of RDRAM, an ATi RAGE graphics card, and an i820 chipset. An "r" suffix was used for Socket 370 versions, while no suffix was used for Slot 1 versions. Later models (especially the "R" series) had a built-in DVD drive.

=== XPS Gen 2 (2003) ===
Included a Pentium 4 processor with Hyper-Threading Technology (3.4 GHz, 800 MHz Bus); Microsoft Windows XP Professional; 400 MHz dual-channel DDR SDRAM (400 MHz); Support for SATA and IDE hard drives; one AGP Slot; four PCI slots; Sound Blaster Audigy²; and Dell Wireless Keyboard and Mouse. The video card included was ATI Radeon 9800 Pro (AGP x8). It was powered by a 460-watt proprietary power supply and featured decorative LEDs on the front of the case which the user could change the colors of in the BIOS.

=== XPS Gen 3 (2004) ===
The base configuration had a Pentium 4 processor at a speed of 3.0 GHz or higher; 512 MiB of DDR, 400 MHz RAM; a single 80 GB 7200 RPM hard drive; an ATI Radeon X800 XT graphics card; and a Sound Blaster Audigy² audio card. It came pre-installed with Windows XP Home Edition.

=== XPS Gen 4 (2004) ===
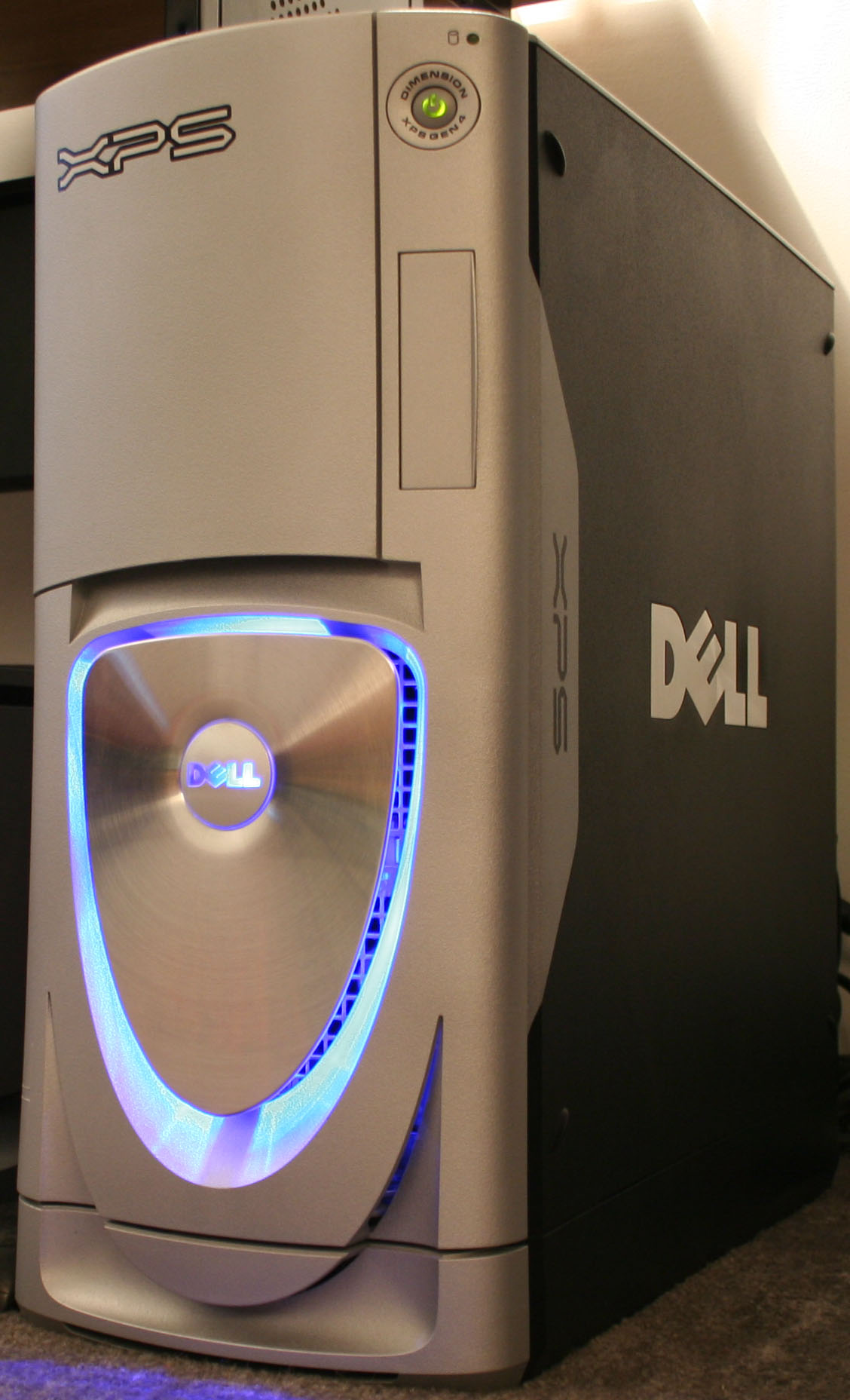
Dell XPS Gen 4

The base configuration had a Pentium 4 processor at a speed of 3.0 GHz or higher; 512 MiB of DDR2, 533 MHz RAM; a single 160 GB 7200 RPM hard drive; an NVIDIA GeForce 6800 graphics card; and a Sound Blaster Audigy² audio card. It came pre-installed with Windows XP Home Edition.

=== XPS Gen 5 (2005) ===
Used a Pentium 4 HT processor with 512 KiB, 1 MiB, or 2 MiB of L2 Cache. It could support up to 8 GiB of DDR2 memory at 533 MHz or 667 MHz.

== XPS 200 series ==
=== XPS 200 (2005) ===
The XPS 200 used a small-form-factor case, making it much smaller than the XPS 400. It was aimed at being a 'low-impact machine', meaning that it was intended to blend in better with a room's features. Despite the XPS name it was more of a multimedia computer than a gaming machine. It did not use full-size PCI slots. This model was available from late 2005 to the end of the third quarter of 2006, before being replaced by the XPS 210.

=== XPS 210, aka Dimension 9200C (2006) ===
The XPS 210 replaced the XPS 200 in 2006, with an upgrade to the Intel Core 2 Duo processor line. It was also sold as the Dimension 9200C outside of the United States. Alongside the 9200 (a rebranded XPS 410) it was the final desktop in the Dimension line, which effectively made an XPS unit the last in the Dimension family.

== XPS 400 series ==
=== XPS 400, aka Dimension 9150 (2005) ===
This model was available during late 2005 and the first half of 2006. It was replaced by the XPS 410, which was nearly identical except for an optional Intel Core 2 Duo processor and slightly different audio and video card options. It was rebranded outside the United States as the Dimension 9150, which was replaced with the Dimension 9200.

=== XPS 410, aka Dimension 9200 (2006) ===
The former intermediate model of the XPS series and bigger brother to the Dimension E520. It featured a base configuration of an Intel Core 2 Duo processor. A 2.4 GHz Core 2 Quad was also available as an option. Other base options included the NVIDIA GeForce 7300LE; 7200RPM SATA-300 hard drive; and dual-channel DDR2 RAM. The case was nearly identical to that of the Dimension E520, with an additional 3.5-inch drive bay which made the case physically taller. The power supply was also slightly more powerful than the Dimension E520 (375 W vs 305 W, respectively and has an added six-pin PCIe power cable). The XPS 410 replaced the XPS 400, and was itself replaced by the XPS 420.

XPS 410 units were also sold as the Dimension 9200 in some countries. Released in 2006, the Dimension 9200 (as well as the Dimension 9200C, which was a rebranded XPS 210) was the final desktop in the Dimension line, effectively making an XPS unit the last in the Dimension family.

=== XPS 420 (2007) ===
This model featured similar components to the XPS 410, but it used different case designs and had new features. This was Dell's media-based computer featuring the Dell Xcelerator (a simple and effective Video Recorder), and an LCD screen in the case, running Windows Vista SideShow. As usual with the 4xx line of XPS, it did not allow for SLI Graphics. The XPS 420 added support for 45 nm Core2 Duo/Quad/ and Extreme CPUs up to the QX9650.

=== XPS 430 (2008) ===
Similar to 420, but with DDR3 RAM and without the LCD on the computer chassis.

=== XPS Studio 435/435T/435MT ===
These model numbers were used for the first Studio XPS desktops (see below).

== XPS 600 series ==
=== XPS 600 (2005) ===
Originally the flagship, prior to the introduction of the XPS 700 series, the XPS 600 featured an Intel dual-core Pentium D 950 processor; dual Nvidia GeForce 7900GTX in SLI mode; a 7200 RPM SATA hard drive; and dual-channel DDR2 RAM. The case design had not changed significantly over the past several generations, with the large aluminum plate on the front.

=== XPS 630, aka 630i (2008) ===
The XPS 630/630i filled the gap between the media-oriented XPS 420/430 and the high-end XPS 730x. It featured a Dell-modified Nvidia NForce 650i chipset which supported both SLI and CrossFire configurations, but lacked ESA certification (the only ESA-certified component was Dell's "Master Input/Output" (or "MIO") printed circuit board). At one time it came standard with an Intel Core 2 Quad Q6600 CPU and dual Nvidia GeForce 8800GT graphics cards.

There was no physical difference(s) between the 630 and the 630i. A marketing concept applied an "i" suffix to designate systems installed with an Intel chipset, with intention to use an "a" suffix for systems with an AMD chipset, but since Intel-based chipsets were the only models ever sold, this designation held no significance. Instead, AMD-based units were later sold under the 625 model number.

Issues with the XPS 630 included problems with the chassis fan control; chassis LED lights; non-shipment of the LightFX 2.0 lightshow control software; limited PCIe slot configuration (8,8,1,1; OEM Nvidia 650i SLI motherboards also offered the 16,1,1,1); constant HDD LED activity; and a reliability issue due to a problem inherent in the Nvidia 650i SLI chipset that could surface when overclocking with 4 or more gigabytes of RAM. The problems resulted in PC PRO revoking their 'Recommended' award. The July 22, 2009 release of a Softex Media Plug-in provided some of the features originally advertised in LightFX. BIOS updates were issued to patch the constant HDD LED activity. Some owners bypassed the aforementioned problems by swapping out the Dell-modified NVidia 650i motherboard with OEM motherboards such as the EVGA nForce 780i SLI FTW. The motherboard had 8 lanes wired for each PCIe slot, which could restrict performance if using a single high-performance graphics card. Performance was equivalent to other systems with NVidia 650i chipset motherboards when using two graphics cards in SLI mode.

=== XPS 625 (2009) ===
A version of the XPS 630 but with AMD Phenom II chips and ATI Graphics.

== XPS 700 series ==
=== XPS 700 (2006) ===
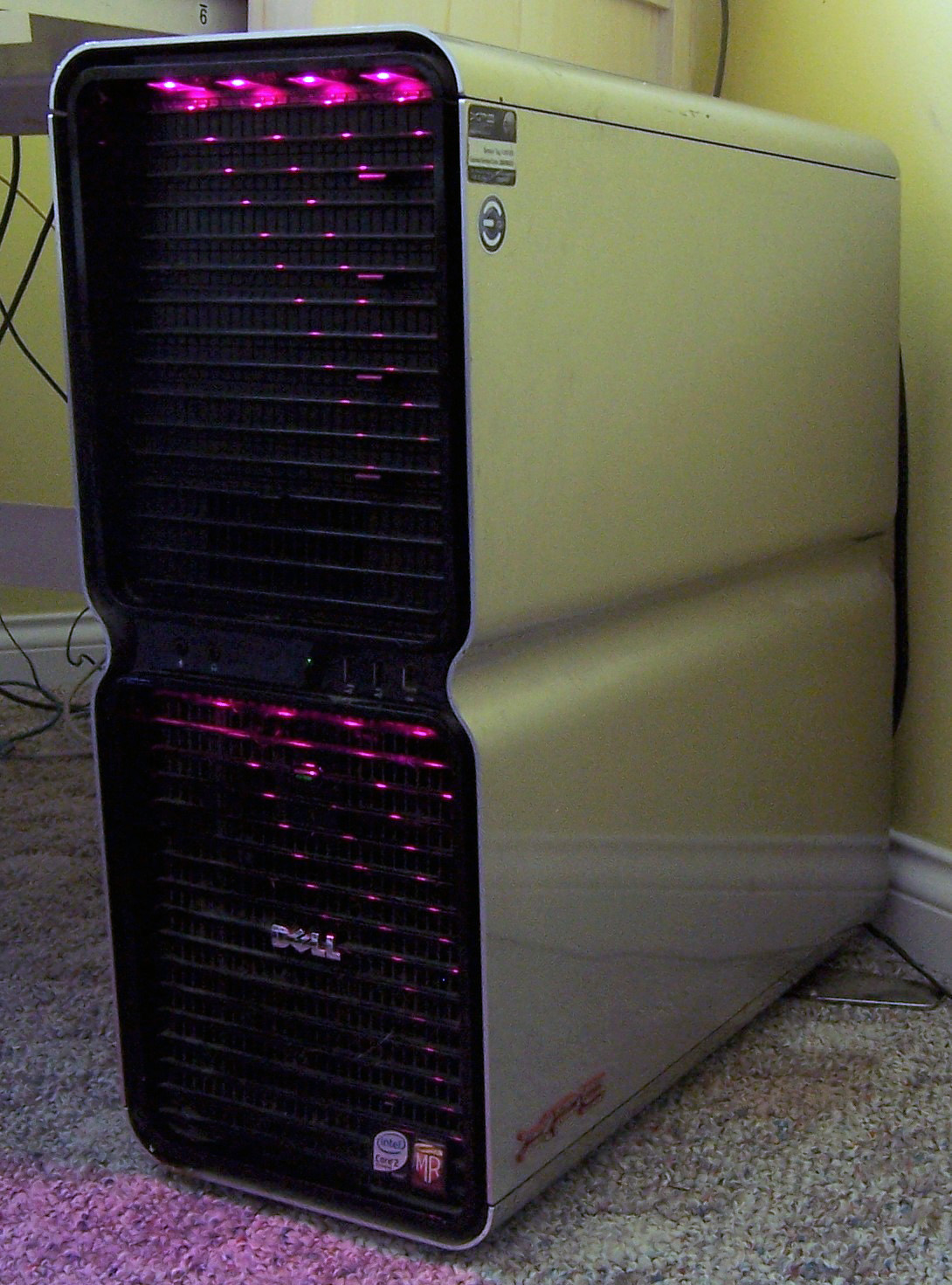
Dell XPS 700

Targeted at the gaming community, the XPS 700 featured the Intel Pentium D Extreme processors with speeds up to 3.7 GHz with dual Nvidia GeForce 7900 GTX GPUs in SLI mode; a 7200 RPM SATA hard drive; and dual-channel DDR2 RAM. It was advertised as being overclockable but actually was not. Dell would later offer a free upgrade program, providing an XPS 720 motherboard to XPS 700 owners so that these machines could be overclocked with the BIOS. The aluminum case featured a distinctive "leaning" design. It used a significantly larger power supply (750 W or 1 kW) than the smaller 200/400/600 series models to accommodate higher-end video cards and overclocked CPUs. Unlike its forerunners, it used a BTX motherboard, thereby limiting possible upgrades.

=== XPS 710 (2006) ===
The XPS 710 featured the new Intel Core 2 Duo and Core 2 Extreme processors, as well as Core 2 Quad processors. Other features included dual NVIDIA GeForce 7950 GX2 in Quad SLI mode; a 7200 RPM SATA hard drive; and dual-channel DDR2 RAM. Like the 700 it was eligible for the 720 model motherboard upgrade program, though not for free.

=== XPS 720, XPS 720 H2C (2007) ===
The XPS 720 was announced on November 24, 2007. A H2C edition was available, along with a Red Special Edition. All came with a 1 kW power supply.

The H2C edition included dual-stage radiator cooling technology, and a motherboard capable of overclocking its quad-core Intel Core 2 Extreme QX6800. It came standard with dual NVIDIA GeForce 8800GTX cards running in SLI for $6,780. It also used slightly higher quality parts than other XPS classes, and at the time it was one of the most powerful pre-built PCs available by a significant margin.

=== XPS 730 H2C (2008) ===
Like the 720 H2C edition, the 730 H2C used H_{2}Ceramic cooling, a high-performance cooling system, which was ideal for gaming and overclocking. Its motherboard, the NVIDIA NForce 790i Ultra, was capable of overclocking its quad-core Intel Core 2 Extreme QX9770 up to 3.64 GHz. It used Dual channel DDR3 SDRAM. There was also a choice of colors at some outlets. The basic model specs were an Intel Core 2 Extreme Processor QX9650 (3.46 GHz Overclocked); dual 1 GiB ATI Radeon 3870 X2 Crossfire X graphics cards; 2 GiB RAM; and 1 TB 7200rpm dual HDDs. The base price in the UK was £2,499.

=== XPS 730X, XPS 730X H2C (2008) ===
Released on November 16, 2008, the XPS 730X was essentially an XPS 730 with a new Intel Core i7 CPU and Intel X58 chipset. The XPS 730X H2C was a higher-end version which used H2Ceramic cooling and often shipped with factory-overclocked Core i7 Extreme Edition processors. The 730X also integrated Alienware's AlienFX and a new theatre lighting system. It supported Tri-Channel 6 GiB of DDR3 RAM. The graphics card was either a dual or single NVIDIA GeForce GTX 285, or a single ATI Radeon HD 4870 X2. It originally shipped with Windows Vista, but eventually offered Windows 7 near the end of its availability.

Dell internally discontinued these models in its US online store on August 1, 2009, and cancelled any remaining orders after August 15, 2009. It has been mentioned that this was done to focus more attention on customers seeking gaming computers, such as Alienware.

== XPS Tower 8000 series ==
=== XPS 8100 (2010) ===
Model 8100 was released in 2010. It was a mid-range, all-purpose PC aimed at home users. It had a Core i5-650 processor, 4 GiB of DDR3 RAM, 1 TB of storage space, and an NVIDIA GTS 240 graphics card as standard.

=== XPS 8300 (2011) ===
Model 8300 used Intel H67 socket 1155 based Sandy bridge CPUs, such as the i5-2320 and i7-2600K, and an 0Y2MRG (DH67M01 TB0420) motherboard.

- Memory: Unbuffered, non-ECC, quad-channel DDR3; 32 GiB max, with 2/4/8 GiB in base
- WLAN: Dell Wireless WLAN Mini-Card
  - Card model 1501, based on Broadcom BCM4313: 802.11 a/b/g/n (2.4 GHz) 150 Mbit/s, plus Bluetooth 5.0
  - Card model 1510, based on Broadcom BCM4322: 802.11 a/b/g/draft-n (2.4 or 5 GHz) 300 Mbit/s
  - Card model 1520, based on Broadcom BCM43224: 802.11 a/b/g/n (2.4 or 5 GHz) 300 Mbit/s

=== XPS 8500 (2012) ===
Model 8500 was released on May 2, 2012. It was the first in this series to have the third-generation (Ivy Bridge) Intel Quad Core i5 and i7 processors. This version of the motherboard used the Intel H77 chipset with LGA 1155 socket and had USB 3.0 ports built into the front. A "Special Edition" (starting price $999 as of January 2013) came standard with advanced features such as an Intel Core i7, Blu-ray drive, and a 32 GiB Intel mSATA SSD mounted on the motherboard to enhance the operational speed of the traditional hard disk.

- Memory: Unbuffered, non-ECC, quad-channel DDR3 (Up to 1600 MHz); 32 GiB max, with 2/4/8 GiB in base
- Video: Integrated Intel HD Graphics 2500/4000 (Up to 1 GiB system), or discreet NVIDIA GeForce GT 620 (1 GiB GDDR5), GT 640 (1 GiB GDDR5), GTX 660 (1.5 GiB GDDR5), AMD Radeon HD 7570 (1 GiB GDDR5), 7770 (2 GiB GDDR5), or 7870 (2 GiB GDDR5)
- LAN: 10/100/1000 Mbit/s integrated network card
- WLAN: 802.11 b/g/n Wi-Fi and Bluetooth 4.0

=== XPS 8700 (2013) ===
Model 8700 was released in 2013. It was designed for moderate to heavy gaming and high-end workstation performance. It featured a Dell 0KWVT8 motherboard with an LGA-1150 socket. A special edition was available with an AMD Radeon R9 270.

- CPU: Either an Intel Core i7-4770 or Intel Core i7-4790
- Memory: Unbuffered, non-ECC, dual-channel DDR3 (Up to 1600 MHz); 32 GiB max, with 2, 4 or 8 GiB in base
- Video: Integrated Intel HD Graphics 4600 (Up to 1.7 GiB system), or discreet NVIDIA GeForce GT 635 (1 GiB DDR3), NVIDIA GeForce GTX 660 (1.5 GiB GDDR5), or AMD Radeon R9 270 (2 GiB GDDR5)
- LAN: 10/100/1000 Mbit/s integrated network card
- WLAN: Dell Wireless WLAN Mini-Card, with the same options as the model 8300

=== XPS 8900 (2015) ===
Model 8900 was released in October 2015. It was designed for moderate to heavy gaming and high-end workstation performance. It featured Intel's 6th-generation (Skylake) i5 and i7 CPUs on an LGA 1151 socket. It also included an upgrade to higher-bandwidth DDR4 memory.

=== XPS Tower 8910 (2016) ===
Dell XPS Towers were released in July 2016. Three systems were introduced: the XPS Tower, XPS Tower VR, and the XPS Tower Special Edition. All systems were introduced with sixth-generation (Skylake) i5 and i7 CPUs; at least 8 GiB of DDR4 RAM; and were designed with an easy-to-open chassis for simple expandability. One of the main differences from the 8900 was that the M.2 connector now supported four PCI-E lanes instead of one. The VR and Special Edition met and exceeded the minimum recommended specifications for running virtual reality and the Special Edition passed testing for the Oculus Ready and HTC Vive Optimized certification programs.

=== XPS Tower 8930 (2017) ===
Model 8930 featured Intel's 8th and 9th-generation i3, i5, and i7 CPUs on an LGA 1151 socket.

=== XPS Tower 8940 (2020) ===
Model 8940 featured Intel's 10th and 11th-generation i3, i5, i7, and i9 CPUs. It had four slots for DDR4 memory for a maximum of 128 GB.

=== XPS Tower 8950 (2022) ===
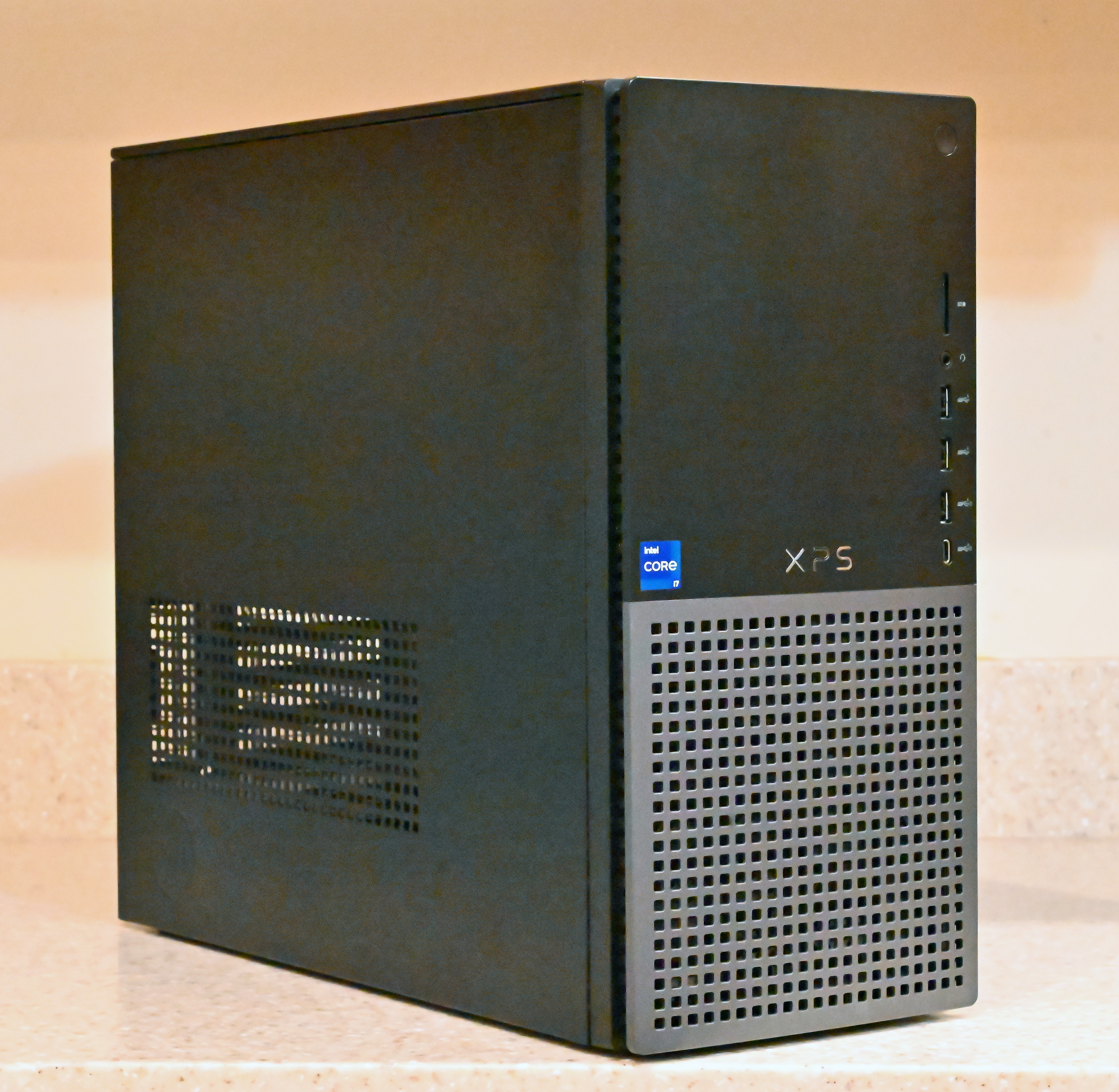
Dell XPS 8950

Model 8950 featured Intel's 12th-generation i3, i5/i5K, i7/i7K/i7F/i7KF, and i9/i9K/i9KF CPUs. It had four slots for DDR5 memory, for a maximum of 128GB. For video/graphics it was equipped with an Nvidia RTX 30/30ti series card.

=== XPS Tower 8960 (2023) ===
Model 8960 featured Intel's 13th and 14th-generation i3, i5, i7, and i9 CPUs. It had two slots for DDR5 memory, for a maximum of 64 GB.

== XPS One series ==
=== XPS One 20 and XPS One 24 (models A2010 and A2420; 2007) ===
Released on November 19, 2007, the Dell XPS One was an all-in-one desktop designed for "minimal fuss and maximum cordless connectivity", and shipped with the power cord, a wireless keyboard with a touchpad, and wireless mouse, prepared to the system. The XPS One 20 (model A2010) was a 20" form, while the XPS One 24 (model A2420) was a 24" form.

Model A2010 had an Intel Core 2 Duo E4500; 2 GB of dual-channel DDR2 SDRAM at 667 MHz; integrated Intel GMA 3100 graphics; a WSXGA (1680x1050) resolution display with 16.7 million colors, a 1000:1 contrast ratio, an 80° viewing angle, and a 5 millisecond response time; and integrated High Definition Audio and 10-watt stereo speakers

Model A2420 had an Intel Core 2 Quad Q8200; 4 GB of dual-channel DDR2 SDRAM at 800 MHz; integrated Intel GMA X4500HD graphics, but could be customized with an NVidia GeForce 9600M GT graphics card when chosen with "PRODUCT (RED)" (see below); a WUXGA (1900x1200) resolution with 16.7 million colors, a 1200:1 contrast ratio, an 89° viewing angle, and a 6 millisecond response time; and had SoundBlaster Audigy HD software with 25-watt premium JBL speakers with an integrated subwoofer.

=== XPS One 27 (model 2710; 2012) ===
The Dell XPS One 27, model 2710, was an all-in-one PC that, hence its name, featured a 27-inch screen with a resolution of 2560x1440.

It received CNET's 2012 Editor's Choice Award and was chosen as PCMag's best all-in-one PC of 2012. CNET editor Rich Brown, who authored the review and gave the award, noted that it "boasts the highest-display resolution among Windows 8 all-in-ones, and at an aggressive price." PCMag's page discussing selections for the best products of the year stated that it "put almost every technology and feature we're looking for in a compact stylish chassis."

There are reports from many buyers complaining of a quality control issue on the screen, with dust particles trapped between the screen and the touch panel. Some buyers received several exchanges or screen replacements and the issue remained. These particles might only have been perceivable after turning up the brightness, and could be mistaken for dead pixels.

== Studio XPS ==
Like the Studio XPS laptops, a line of desktops were released, starting in 2008, combining the Studio and XPS brand names, denoting higher-end Studio models. Model numbers initially started off as 4xx numbers, logically a continuation of the XPS 400 series (see below), however they were soon rebranded with new 4-digit numbering.

=== Studio XPS 435/435T (2008) ===
The Studio XPS 435T originally shipped with a Nehalem-based Intel Core i7 processor and Intel X58 chipset, allowing for 3 memory channels over 6 available DIMM slots. It could support Westmere-based Core i7 and Xeon processors (supporting up to 6 cores) with a BIOS update. The T supposedly referred to tower, in contrast to MT meaning mini-tower.

=== Studio XPS 435MT (2008) ===
The Studio XPS 435MT, released alongside the 435T, was a smaller version of the 435T, using a mini-tower chassis. It had RAID0/1 support. Unlike the 435T, the 435MT's BIOS was never updated to support Westmere-based Core i7 or Xeon chips. The motherboard was a variation of the MSI 7591 MicroATX.

=== Studio XPS 8000 and 9000 (2009) ===
In 2009 the 435T was updated with new processors and renamed to the Studio XPS 9000. A cheaper Studio XPS 8000 model was released alongside of it. The 8000 used an Intel Core i7-870, i7-860, or i5-750 processor with a P55 chipset and up to 16GiB of RAM. The 9000 used an Intel Core i7 920 processor and could have up to 24 GiB of RAM.

=== Studio XPS 7100, 8100 and 9100 (2010) ===
The Studio XPS 8100 and 9100 further updated the 8000 and 9000 with newer processors, and introduced the new 7100 to the lineup. The 9100 supported the Intel Core i7-980X. The 8100 could sport an Intel Core i3-530, i3-540, i5-650, i5-660, i5-661, i5-670, i7-750, i7-860, or i7-870 processor, with a H57 chipset. The 7100 sported AMD's Phenom II X6 chips.
