= Dell XPS =

Line of high-performance computers by Dell

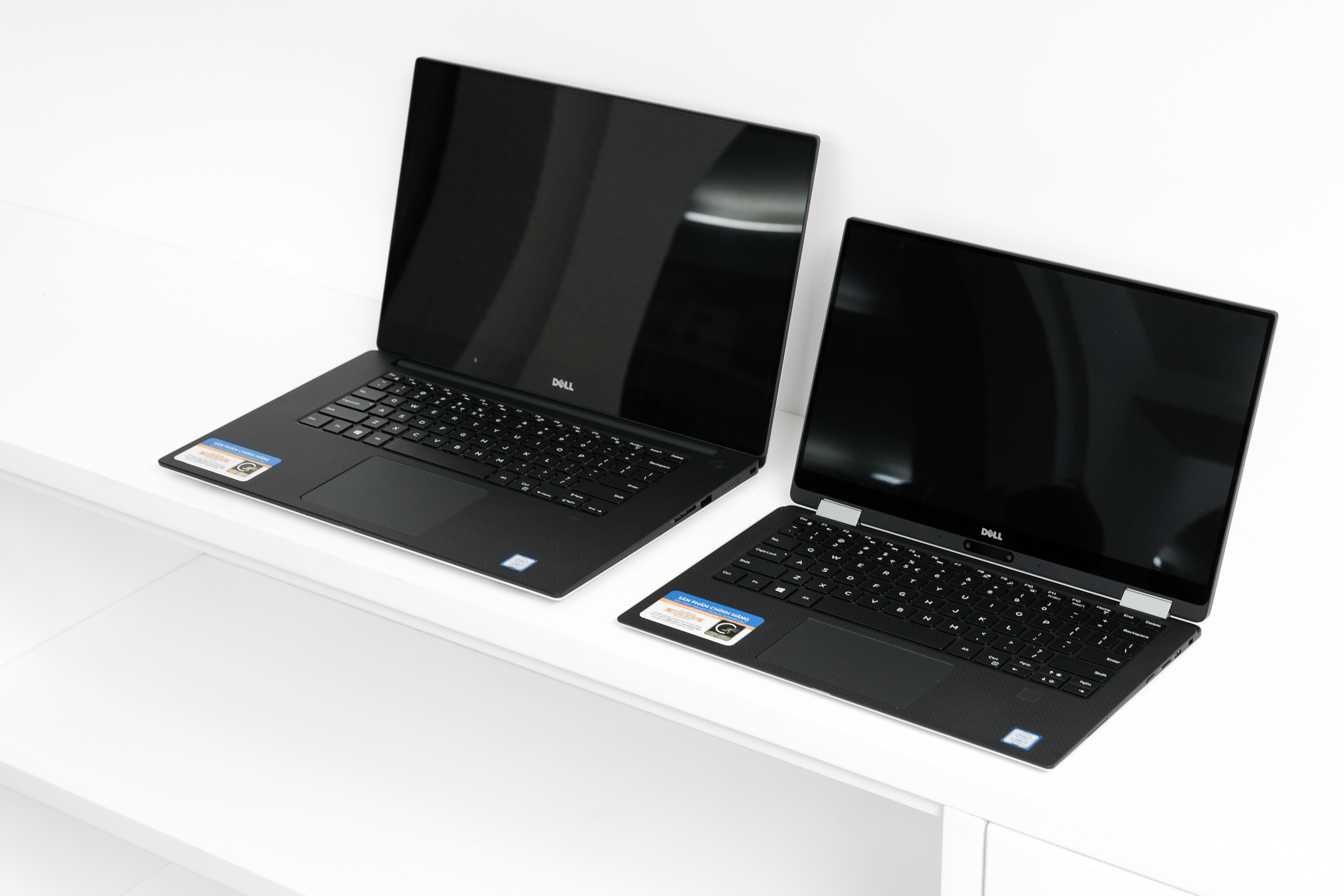
- A Dell XPS 13 and 15 (c. 2017)
- Developer: Dell
- Manufacturer: Dell
- Type: Laptop, Desktop
- Released: 1993; 33 years ago (as Dimension sub-brand); 2008 (as separate product family)
- Operating system: Windows, Linux
- CPU: Intel, AMD, Qualcomm
- Graphics: Intel/AMD/Qualcomm (integrated); ATI/AMD/Nvidia (discrete)
- Marketing target: Consumer
- Related: Inspiron, Vostro, Latitude
- Website: www.dell.com/xps

XPS ("Extreme Performance System") is a family of consumer-oriented high-end laptop and desktop computers manufactured by Dell since 1993, formerly part of Dimension, and since 2008 as a standalone brand.

== History ==
Logo (2004–2014)

In the early 1990s, Dell primarily targeted its products at businesses rather than consumers. In early 1993, Dell executives met to address how to pursue the emerging consumer market in the US (led by Gateway 2000, later known as Gateway), and decided to launch a new product line to compete with Gateway. At that time, Dell's annual revenue was less than $500 million, and founder Michael Dell was still directly involved in key decisions. Vernon Weiss, the product manager, led the project and managed product marketing, while Brian Zucker oversaw architecture and engineering.

In September 1993, the first two products in the XPS line were announced, initially as part of the Dimension series. The first generation XPS systems were available in both desktop and tower configurations. The earliest known XPS PC, the Dell Dimension XPS 466V, was released in 1994, which was a version of the pre-existing Dell Dimension 466V. The new product line achieved commercial success, garnering significant media attention. For example, an XPS was featured on the cover of the October 1993 issue of PC/Computing.

From 1997 to 2001, the XPS line lost its leading position in the market as Dell steadily grew and the market continued to evolve over time. Dell then revamped the XPS line in 2005 to compete with Alienware (then a separate company) and Falcon Northwest. Correspondingly, Dell split its home desktop and consumer notebook systems each into two lines, Dimension and XPS for desktop, and Inspiron and XPS for notebook. Shortly thereafter, on March 22, 2006, Dell acquired Alienware, a move they had been considering since 2002. Alienware maintained its autonomy in terms of design and marketing, but access to Dell's supply chain management, purchasing power, and economies of scale lowered its operating costs. The new XPS line initially had the same specifications as those offered by the Alienware division.

In 2008, Dell introduced the "Studio XPS" line, which it marketed as a performance computer line, while Alienware was advertised for gaming. On June 2, 2009, the M18z gaming laptop was introduced as the first joint-Alienware/Dell branded system.

In January 2025 Dell announced a major restructuring that saw the demise of the XPS brand, along with others. This was short lived however, since XPS was restored the following year.

== Types ==
The Dell Inspiron lineup consisted of laptops, desktops, and tablets.

- Dell XPS laptops
- Dell XPS desktop computers

=== Tablets ===
==== XPS 10 (2012) ====
The XPS 10 was an ARM-based convertible tablet with a keyboard stand, similar to Microsoft's Surface RT. The tablet, which ran Windows RT, was unveiled on August 30, 2012 and discontinued in September 2013.

==== XPS 18 (2013) ====
The Dell XPS 18 was announced in April 2013. It was an all-in-one computer that also functioned as a large tablet. It had a screen size of 18.4 inches.

== Special editions ==
Dell has introduced a handful of "speciality" models which were based upon particular models in the XPS series but had unique characteristics. These included custom cases and higher-performance parts (processors, video cards, etc.). Some of these models are considerably rare because they were produced in limited quantities and were either extremely expensive or giveaway only (as was the case of the XPS X-Men Edition, see below).

=== XPS 600 Renegade ===
The first example of a special edition in Dell's XPS series was the XPS 600 Renegade, released in early 2006, which included an Intel Pentium D Extreme Edition 965 processor that was overclocked at the factory from 3.73 GHz to 4.26 GHz. Despite the overclock, Dell honoured Intel's warranty for the processor. The case featured an air-brush paint job completed by Mike Lavallee. Most notably, the machine was the first commercially available system to feature a Quad-SLI configuration, with four custom NVIDIA GeForce 7900GTX graphics cards with 512 MiB of memory. It also included a Western Digital hard drive spinning at 10,000 RPM. The XPS 600 Renegade had an introduction price of $9,930.

=== XPS X-Men Giveaway ===
In 2007 Dell announced a special X-Men version XPS desktop system that was going to be given away. The system had a value of around $10,000 and featured a one-of-a-kind quad NVIDIA video cards and an Intel Pentium 965 Extreme Edition processor. The case resembled a standard XPS 710 series with X-Men artwork on the side.

=== W.O.W. M1730 ===
At CES in 2008, Dell announced a World of Warcraft edition of the M1730 laptop. This version of the M1730 cost around $4,500 and featured an overclockable Intel Extreme Edition Core 2 Duo processor; NVIDIA SLI DX10 graphics cards; PhysX card; and a Full HD 17-inch widescreen display. It also came pre-loaded with World of Warcraft and Burning Crusade expansion, as well as other limited edition merchandise including a custom backpack.

=== (PRODUCT)^{RED} ===
In March 2008 Dell introduced the XPS RED as a part of the (PRODUCT)^{RED} line of products, with portions of the profit going towards the cause.
