= Alienware =

American computer hardware subsidiary of Dell Inc.

Alienware Corporation

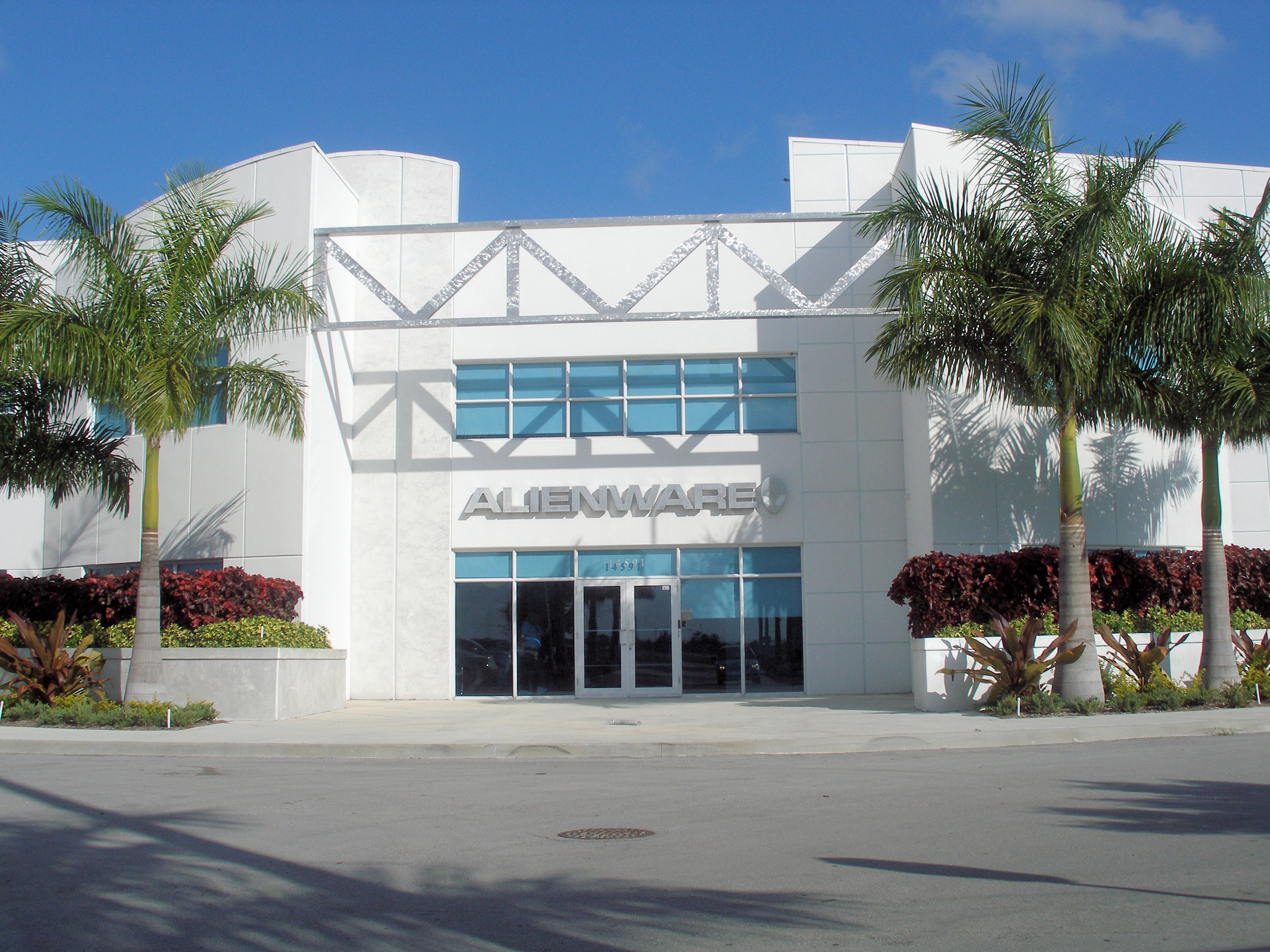
- Headquarters in 2008
- Formerly: Sakai of Miami Inc. (1996-1999)
- Type: Subsidiary
- Industry: Computer hardware
- Founded: October 15, 1996; 30 years ago
- Founders: Nelson Gonzalez, Alex Aguila
- Headquarters: The Hammocks, Miami, Florida, United States
- Key people: Michael Dell (CEO)
- Products: Desktops; Notebooks; Peripherals; Monitors
- Number of employees: 490
- Parent: Dell Inc.
- Website: alienware.com

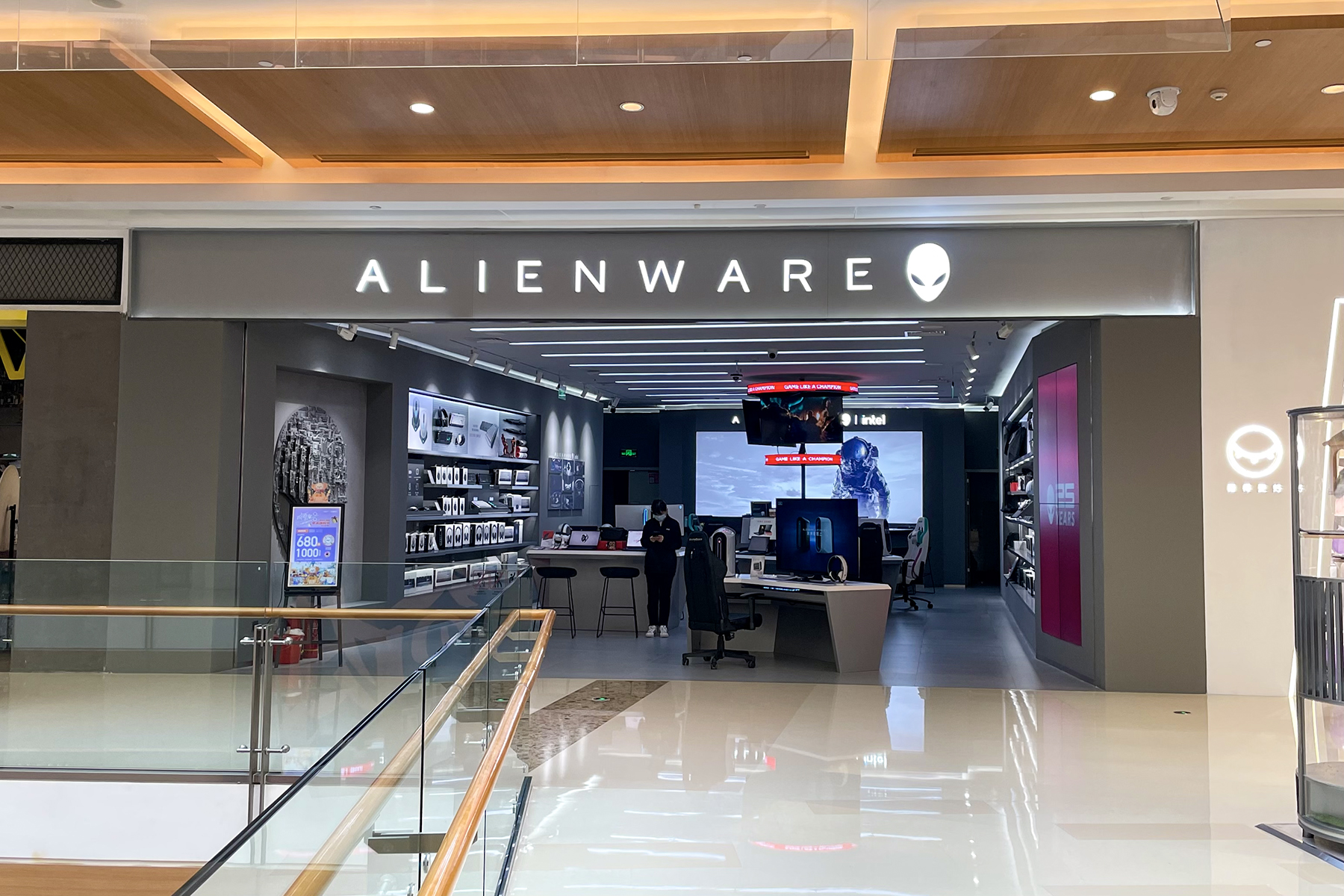
An Alienware retail store in Zhengzhou, China

Alienware Corporation is an American computer hardware subsidiary brand of Dell Inc.. Their product range is dedicated to gaming computers and accessories, which can be identified by its alien-themed designs. Alienware was founded in 1996 by Nelson Gonzalez and Alex Aguila. The development of the company is also associated with Frank Azor, Arthur Lewis, Joe Balerdi, and Michael S. Dell (CEO). The company's corporate headquarters is located in The Hammocks, Miami, Florida.

== History ==
=== Founding ===
Alienware was formally established on October 15, 1996, as Sakai of Miami Inc. by Nelson Gonzalez and Alex Aguila, two childhood friends. It assembled desktops, notebooks, workstations, and PC gaming consoles. In 1999 the company name was changed to Alienware Corporation. According to employees, the name "Alienware" was chosen because of the founders' fondness for the hit television series The X-Files, which also inspired the science-fiction themed names of product lines such as Area-51, Hangar 18, and Aurora.

=== Acquisition by Dell ===
Dell Inc. had considered buying Alienware as early as 2002, but did not go through with the purchase until March 2006. As a subsidiary of Dell, Alienware retains control of its design and marketing while benefiting from Dell's purchasing power, economies of scale, and supply chain, which lowered its operating costs.

Initially, Dell maintained its competing XPS line of gaming PCs, often selling computers with similar specifications, which may have hurt Alienware's market share within its market segment. Due to corporate restructuring in the spring of 2008, the XPS brand was scaled down, and the desktop line was eliminated, leaving only XPS notebooks, but XPS desktop models had returned by the end of the year. Product development of gaming PCs was consolidated with Dell's gaming division, with Alienware becoming Dell's premier gaming brand. On June 2, 2009, The M17x was introduced as the first Alienware/Dell branded system. This launch also expanded Alienware's global reach from six to 35 countries while supporting 17 different languages.

== Products (after acquisition by Dell) ==
=== Windows OS-based consoles ===
Alienware announced that it would be releasing a series of video game consoles starting in 2014, aiming to compete with Sony's PlayStation 4, Nintendo's Wii U, and Microsoft's Xbox One. The first version in this series, the Alpha, ran Windows 8.1. The operating system and ability to play PC games is what separates the Alpha from the eighth generation of video game consoles. At the E3 2016, Alienware announced the second rendition of the Alpha, the Alpha R2. The R2 adds 6th generation Intel processors, a choice of either AMD's Radeon R9 M470X or Nvidia's GeForce 960 graphics cards, and support for Alienware's proprietary Graphics Amplifier. It also ships with Windows 10.

=== Graphics Amplifier ===
The Graphics Amplifier allows an Alienware laptop to run most full length (or smaller, non-hybrid) desktop GPUs. A proprietary PCIe 3.0 ×4 cable is used instead of the Thunderbolt 3 cable used on most other eGPUs.

=== Laptops ===
==== 18 inch ====
- M18x – Introduced in 2011, it is considered a replacement for the original M17x design, but with a bigger chassis, a screen up to 18.4 inches (47 cm), dual MXM 3.0B GPU support, special keyboard macros, and up to 32 GB of DDR3-1600 MHz RAM. Shipped with Intel Sandy Bridge processors and the option of single or dual AMD Radeon 6870M/6970M/6990M Radeon HD 6000 series GPU(s), single or dual Nvidia GeForce 500 series GPU(s). Factory CPU overclocking was also an available option.
- M18x-R2 – 2012 revision of the M18x; originally shipped with Intel Sandy Bridge processors, later shipped with updated with Intel Ivy Bridge processors, single or dual Nvidia GeForce 600 series GPU(s), single or dual AMD Radeon HD 7970M Radeon HD 7000 series GPU(s), up to 32 GB of DDR3-1600 MHz, and optional factory overclock.
- Alienware 18 – 2013 refresh of the M18x; updated with Intel Haswell Processors, single or dual Nvidia GeForce 700 series GPU(s), single or dual AMD Radeon R9 M290X GPU(s), and up to 32 GB of DDR3L-1600 MHz RAM, and 1 TB RAID 0 SSDs along with facelift with new design. Marketed as "Alienware 18" but listed in some countries as "M18XR3 Viking".
- Alienware 18 R2 (2014) – 2014 Updated version of the Alienware 18 or "M18x R3"; updated with Intel Haswell micro architecture processors, single or dual Nvidia GeForce 800 series GPU(s), up to 32 GB of DDR3-1600 MHz, and optional overclock.
- Alienware 18 R3 (2015) – 2015 version was a limited re-release of the previous Alienware 18, with updated dual Nvidia GeForce 900 series GPUs and up to 32 GB of DDR3L-1600 MHz.
- Alienware m18 (2023) – The new version of the Alienware m series featuring 18-inch display, 13th-gen Intel Core / Ryzen 7000 series CPU and Nvidia GeForce RTX 40 Series Laptop GPU.
- Alienware 18 Area-51 (2025) - The Area-51 line returns with an 18-inch QHD+ (2560 x 1600p) screen, Intel Core Ultra 9 275HX CPU with 24 cores, and NVIDIA GeForce RTX 50 Series Laptop GPU.

==== 17 inch ====
- M17x – Introduced in 2009, it is the first laptop released by Alienware after the company was bought by Dell. The name and some of the design is based on the Alienware 17-inch laptop, the Alienware M17.
- M17x-R2 – 2010 revision of the M17x, adding support for Intel i5 and i7 processors, dual MXM 3.0B graphic cards.
- M17x-R3 – 2011 revision of the M17x, changes from aluminium chassis to a simplified plastic design, 3D Ready through a 120 Hz screen. Removes Dual-GPU capability.
- M17x-R4 – 2012 revision of the M17x, updated with Windows 8, Intel Ivybridge Processors and Nvidia GeForce 600 series or the AMD Radeon HD 7970M.
- Alienware 17 – 2013 refresh of the M17x, updated with Intel Haswell Processors and Nvidia GeForce 700 series GPUs or the AMD R9 M290X with new facelift and body design. Marketed as "Alienware 17" but listed in some countries and order details as "M17XR5 Ranger". Updated with Nvidia GeForce 800 series in 2014
- Alienware 17 R2 – 2015 revision of the Alienware 17, updated with Nvidia GeForce 900 series. Features FHD matte display or FHD touch display. A port on the rear for graphics amplifier. This model introduced BGA mounted CPU and GPU, removing the ability to replace the CPU or GPU without changing the entire motherboard.
- Alienware 17 R3 – 2015 refresh of the Alienware 17, Windows 10 available. Features FHD overclocking display. Ultra HD IGZO display also available, as well as a Nvidia GeForce 900 series with 4 GB GDDR5 and 8 GB GDDR5 option.
- Alienware 17 R4 – 2016 Alienware 17 (2016), Windows 10. Features 6th / 7th generation Intel CPU, Tobii eye tracking, Ultra HD display also available, as well as a Nvidia GeForce 1000 series with up to 8 GB GDDR5.
- Alienware 17 R5 – 2018 Alienware 17 (2018), Windows 10. Features Tobii eye tracking, Ultra HD display also available, as well as a Nvidia GeForce 1000 series with up to 8 GB GDDR5, 8th / 9th generation of Intel processors.
- Alienware M17 – 2018 Thin and light gaming laptop for 17" category. Comes with 8th Gen Intel CPU up to Core i9-8950HK, RTX 2070 Max-Q, 16 GB of RAM and 17.3 inches (44 cm) 1080p display with optional 4K upgrade.
- Alienware Area-51m – 2019 desktop replacement gaming laptop with a desktop CPU, up to Intel Core i9-9900K (from i7 8700 to i9 9900K), 128 GB of upgradeable memory, upgradeable GPU (ships with GTX 1080 but will be upgraded to RTX 2080) and overclockable as well. Also features two power adapters and new Legend design language for Alienware.
- Alienware M17 R2 – 2019 Thin and light gaming laptop for 17" category, replace the M17 after 6 months of announcing. Comes with 9th Gen Intel CPU up to Core i9-9980HK, up to RTX 2080 Max-Q, 16 GB of RAM and 17.3 inches (44 cm) 1080p display with optional 4K upgrade. The Alienware m17 R2 will be based on the same design language and chassis material as the beefier 17.3-inch Area-51M.
- Alienware Area-51m R2 – 2020 Alienware took the world's first fully upgradable gaming laptop and added the latest 10th-gen Intel processors and an optional 4K screen — a first for the Area-51 lineup.
- Alienware M17 R3 – 2020 Thin and light gaming laptop for the 17" category. Comes with 10th generation Intel CPU up to Core i9-10980HK, up to Nvidia GeForce RTX 2080 Super 8 GB GDDR6, 32 GB of RAM and 17.3-inch (44 cm) 3840 × 2160 60 Hz 25 ms 500 cd/m^{2} 100% Adobe RGB color gamut display with Tobii Eye tracking technology.
- Alienware M17 R4 – 2021 Thin and light gaming laptop for the 17" category. Equipped with 10th generation Intel CPU up to Core i9-10980HK, up to Nvidia GeForce RTX 3080 16 GB GDDR6 Graphics Card, 32 GB DDR4 RAM at 2933 MHz, 17.3-inch (44 cm) 3840 × 2160 60 fps. The RTX 3080 also includes support for ray tracing and DLSS.
- Alienware X17 R1 – 2021 Thin and light gaming laptop for the 17" category. Equipped with 11th generation Intel CPU up to Core i9-11900H, up to Nvidia GeForce RTX 3080 16 GB GDDR6 Graphics Card, 32 GB DDR4 RAM at 3466 MHz, 17.3-inch (44 cm) 3840 × 2160 60 fps. Thinnest 17-inch Alienware laptop so far.
- Alienware M17 R5 – 2022 Thin and light gaming laptop for the 17" category. Equipped with 6th generation AMD CPU up to Ryzen 9 6900HX, up to Nvidia GeForce RTX 3080Ti 16 GB GDDR6 Graphics Card, 32 GB DDR5 RAM at 4800 MHz, 17.3-inch (44 cm) 3840 × 2160 60 fps.
- Alienware X17 R2 – 2022 Thin and light gaming laptop for the 17" category. Equipped with 12th-generation Intel CPU up to Core i9-12900H, up to Nvidia GeForce RTX 3080Ti 16 GB GDDR6 Graphics Card, 32 GB DDR5 RAM at 4800 MHz, 17.3-inch (44 cm) 3840 × 2160 60 fps. Thinnest 17-inch Alienware laptop so far.

==== 16 inch ====
- Alienware m16 (2023) – The new version of the Alienware m series featuring 16-inch display, 13th-gen Intel Core / Ryzen 7000 series CPU and Nvidia GeForce RTX 40 Series Laptop GPU.
- Alienware 16 Aurora (2025) - Alienware 16-inch laptop from the Versatile line-up, Intel Core 7-240H Series 2 or Intel Core 9-270H, Nvidia RTX 5050/RTX 5060/RTX 5070, 16GB/32GB DDR5, 512GB/1TB SSD

==== 15 inch ====
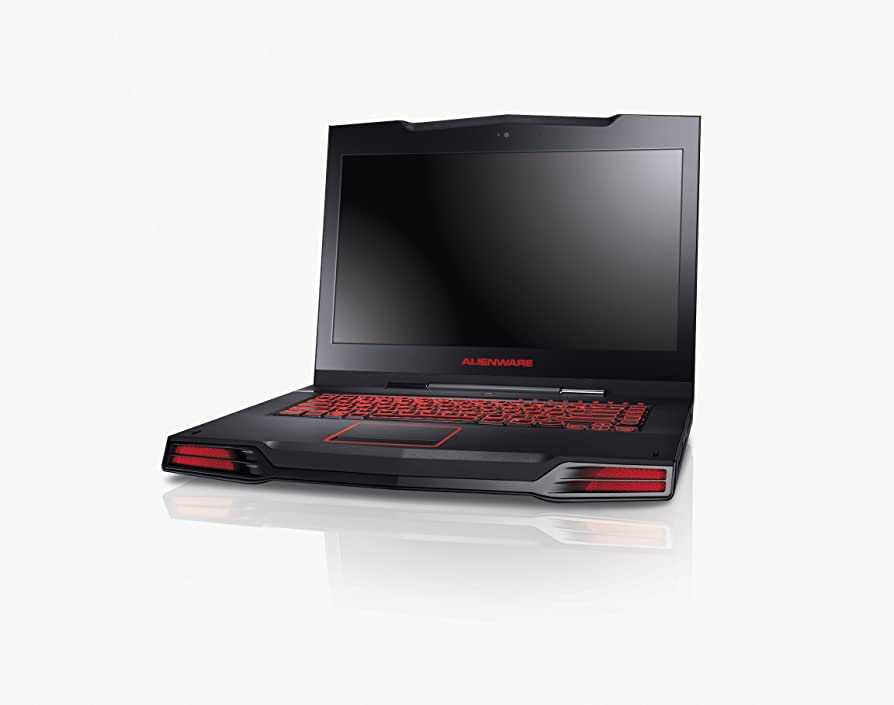
Alienware M15x

- M15x – 2009 With 1st generation Intel i3/i5/i7 and Nvidia GeForce 200 series.
- Alienware 15 – 2015 revision of the M15x, updated with Intel Haswell Processors and Nvidia GeForce 900 series. Features FHD matte display or UHD touch display. Features a port on the rear for graphics amplifier.
- Alienware 15 R2 – 2015 refresh of the Alienware 15, updated with Intel Skylake processors and using the same NVIDIA graphics chipsets. Uses same FHD and 4K UHD screens and graphics amplifier port on the rear.
- Alienware 15 R3 – 2016 Alienware 15 (2016), Windows 10. 6th / 7th gen Intel CPU, 1080p standard display and Ultra HD 4K display and 120 Hz TN+WVA Anti-Glare 400 nit NVIDIA G-SYNC Enabled Display also available, as well as a Nvidia GeForce 1000 series with up to 8 GB GDDR5.
- Alienware 15 R4 – Early 2018 Alienware 15 (2018), Windows 10. Features Tobii eye tracking, Ultra HD Display also available, as well as a Nvidia GeForce 1000 series with up to 8 GB GDDR5, 8th / 9th gen Intel CPU (i7 8750H or i9 8950HK)
- Alienware M15 – 2018 thin and light gaming laptop. 1080p standard display and Ultra HD 4K display and 144 Hz IPS 1080p display also available, as well as a Nvidia GeForce 1000 series with up to a GTX 2070 Max-Q design.
- Alienware M15 R2 – 2019 thin and light gaming laptop. 1080p standard display and 60 Hz Ultra HD 4K display, 144 Hz IPS 1080p, and 240 Hz IPS 1080p display also available, as well as a Nvidia GeForce 20 series with up to a RTX 2080 Max-Q, 9th gen Intel CPU.
- Alienware M15 R3 – 2020 thin and light gaming laptop. 1080p standard display and 60 Hz Ultra HD 4K display, 144 Hz IPS 1080p, and 240 Hz IPS 1080p display also available, as well as a Nvidia GeForce 20 series with up to a RTX 2080 Super Max-Q, 10th gen Intel CPU.
- Alienware M15 R4 – Early 2021 thin and light gaming laptop. 1920 × 1080 standard display and 60 Hz 3840 × 2160 display, 144 Hz IPS 1920 × 1080, and 300 Hz IPS display also available, as well as a Nvidia GeForce 30 series with up to a RTX 3080 mobile and Intel 10th generation CPU. Features Tobii eye tracking with 3840 × 2160 variant.
- Alienware M15 R5 – 2021 thin and light gaming laptop. 1920 × 1080 standard display and 60 Hz 3840 × 2160 display, 144 Hz IPS 1920 × 1080, and 300 Hz IPS display also available, as well as a Nvidia GeForce 30 series with up to a RTX 3080 mobile and AMD Ryzen 5th generation CPU. Features Tobii eye tracking with 3840 × 2160 variant.
- Alienware M15 R6 – 2021 thin and light gaming laptop. 1920 × 1080 standard display and 60 Hz 3840 × 2160 display, 144 Hz IPS 1920 × 1080, and 300 Hz IPS display also available, as well as a Nvidia GeForce 30 series with up to a RTX 3080 mobile and Intel 11th generation CPU. Features Tobii eye tracking with 3840 × 2160 variant.
- Alienware X15 R1 – 2021 thin and light gaming laptop, updated with Intel 11th gen Alder Lake processors and Nvidia RTX 30 series GPUs. Thinnest 15-inch Alienware laptop so far.
- Alienware M15 R7 – 2022 thin and light gaming laptop. 1920 × 1080 standard display and 60 Hz 3840 × 2160 display, 144 Hz IPS 1920 × 1080, and 300 Hz IPS display also available, as well as a Nvidia GeForce 30 series with up to a RTX 3080 mobile and Intel 12th generation CPU. Features Tobii eye tracking with 3840 × 2160 variant.
- Alienware X15 R2 – 2022 refresh of the X15 R1, updated with Intel 12th gen Alder Lake processors and Nvidia RTX 30 series GPUs. Thinnest 15-inch Alienware laptop so far.

==== 14 inch ====
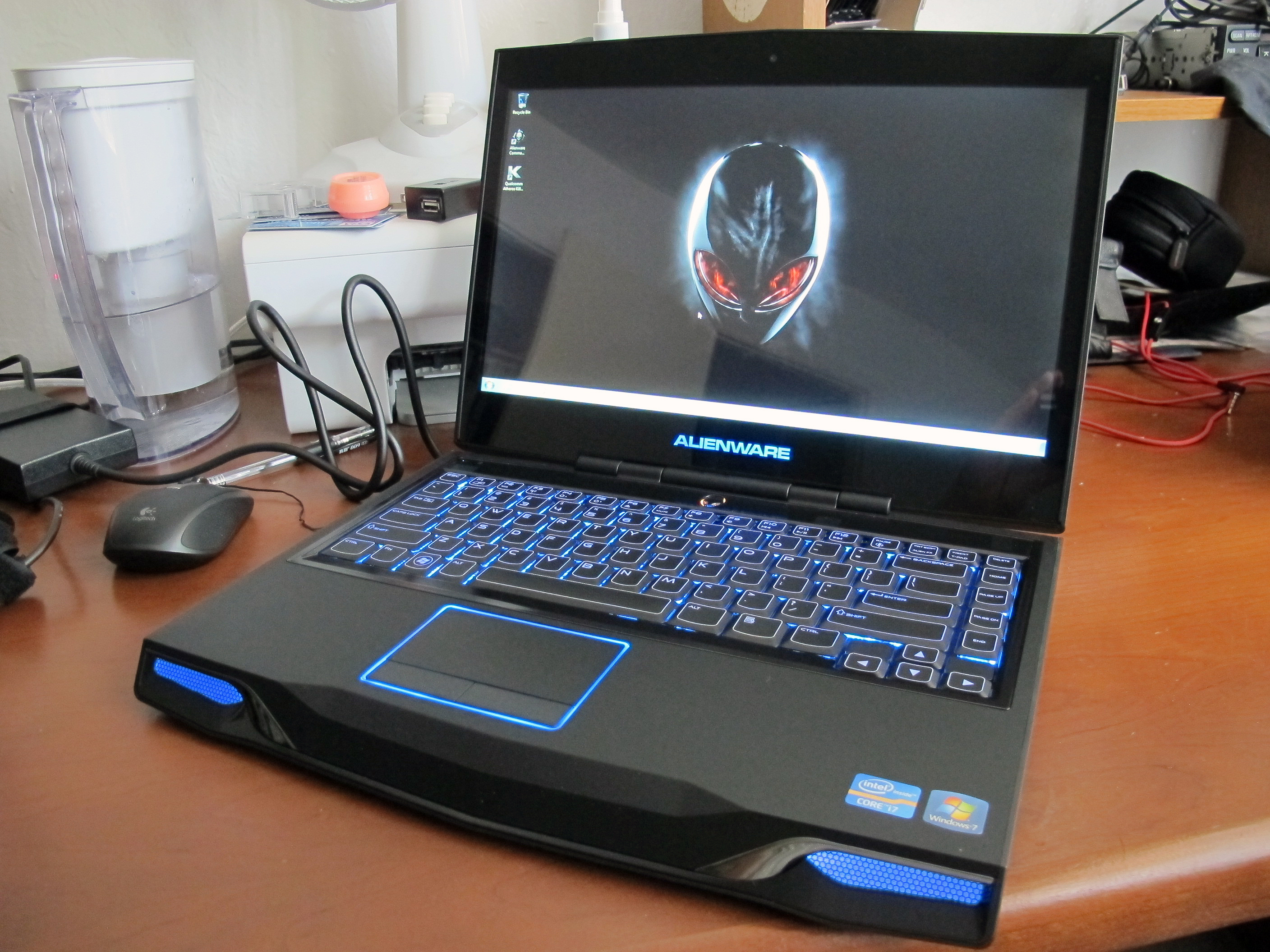
Alienware M14x

- M14x – Introduced in 2011 as a replacement for the M15x, with Nvidia GeForce 500 series and support for Intel i5 and i7 processors.
- M14x-R2 – 2012 revision of the M14x, updated with Intel Ivy Bridge processors and Nvidia GeForce 600 series and Blu-ray slot drive.
- Alienware 14 – 2013 refresh of the M14x, updated with Intel Haswell Processors and Nvidia GeForce 700 series and Blu-ray slot drive with new facelift and body design. It also features an IPS display. Marketed as "Alienware 14" but listed in some countries and order details as "M14XR3".
- Alienware X14 – 2022 refresh of the 14, updated with Intel 12th-gen Alder Lake processors and Nvidia RTX 30 series GPUs.

==== 13 inch ====
- Alienware 13 – Introduced in 2014 as a replacement for the M11x, with Nvidia GeForce GTX 860M and ULV Intel Haswell and Broadwell i5 or i7 processors. Features HD or FHD matte displays or QHD touch display. Alienware's thinnest gaming laptop to date. Updated with Nvidia GeForce GTX 960M in 2015. A port on the rear for graphics amplifier.
- Alienware 13 R2 – 2015 refresh of the Alienware 13 featuring ULV Intel Skylake processors. It retains the same Nvidia GeForce GTX 960M from the previous generation.
- Alienware 13 R3 – Refreshed 2016 Alienware 13 featuring either a 13.3 inches (34 cm) FHD (1920 × 1080) IPS Anti-Glare 300 nit display or a 13.3-inch QHD (2560 × 1440) OLED Anti-Glare 400 cd/m^{2} Display with Touch Technology. It is equipped with a Nvidia GeForce 1000 series GTX 1060 with 6 GB GDDR5. This generation also saw the use of the H-series quad-core CPUs as opposed to the ULV CPUs.

==== 11.6 inch ====
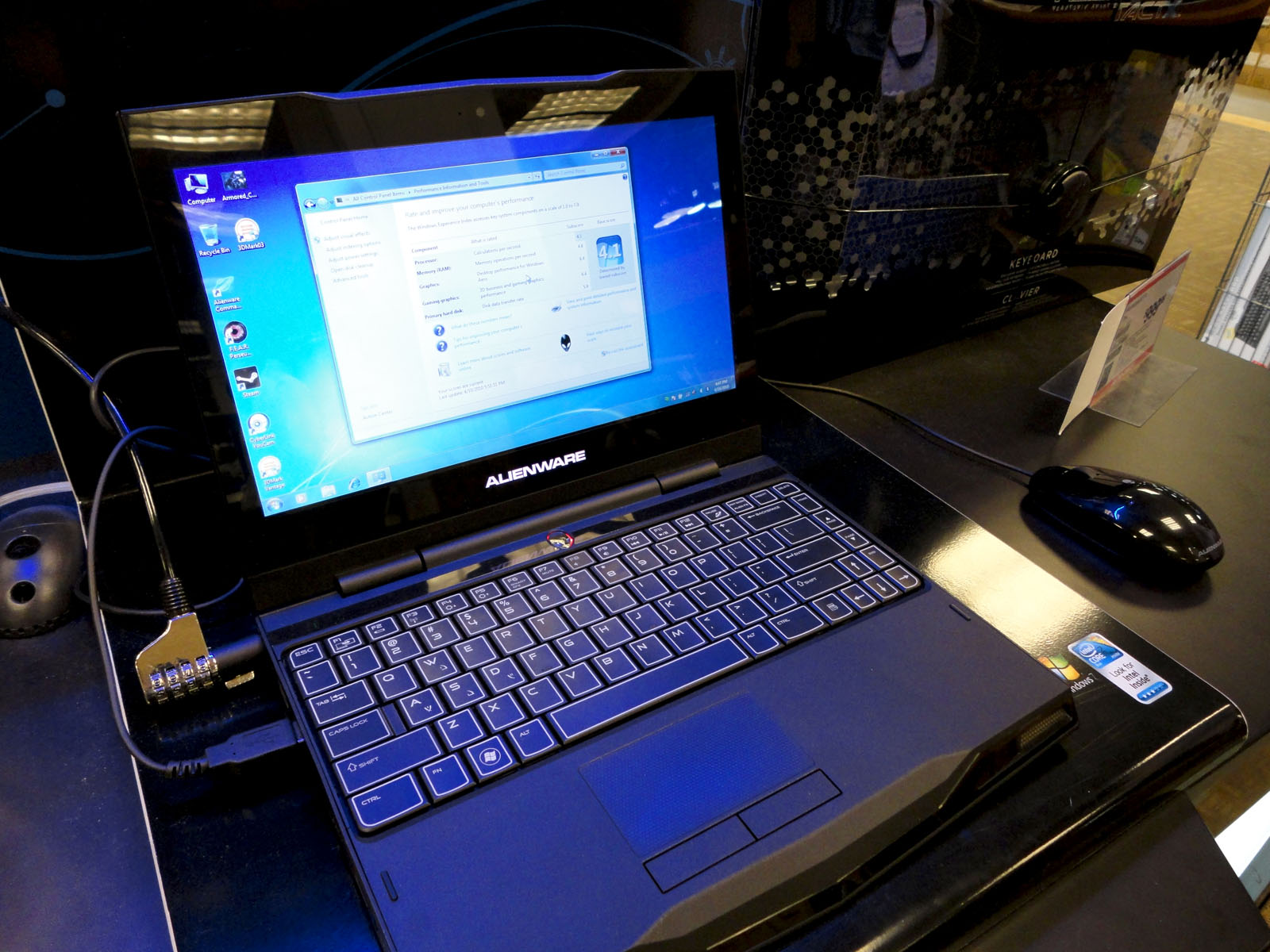
Alienware M11x

- M11x – First introduced in early 2010, it was the smallest-size gaming laptop from Alienware. It was equipped with 1 GB DDR3 RAM and a Penryn dual-core processor, with a Pentium SU4100 at the entry-level and a Core 2 Duo SU7300 at the top. Driving the 11.6 inches (29 cm) screen were two video processors, a GMA 4500MHD integrated and a discrete Nvidia GeForce GT 335M.
- M11x-R2 – The late 2010 revision, it used ULV Intel Arrandale Core i5 and i7 processors. The revision also added a rubberized "soft-touch" exterior to the design. The same GT 335M was used for video; however, NVIDIA's Optimus technology had been added to automatically switch between it and the still-used GMA 4500MHD.
- M11x-R3 – The 2011 revision, it added support for the second generation of Intel's Mobility series Core i3, i5, and i7 processors. It also provided a 500 GB 7200 RPM HDD. It included the Nvidia GeForce GT 540M and integrated Intel HD Graphics 3000. A second revision of the motherboard design used on the R3 series came in Q4 2011, although on a limited amount of laptops. This version used the Nvidia GeForce GT 550M.

In 2012, Alienware announced that it would discontinue the M11x model due to decreasing consumer interest in small form factor gaming laptops. The company went on to offer refreshed models for the rest of its laptop range: the M14x, M17x, and M18x.

==== Specifications ====
| Model | Display | Processor | Chipset | Graphics | RAM | Storage | Networking | Audio | Battery | Operating system |
11 Inch
| M11x (Early 2010) | 11.6": (1366x768) | Intel Pentium Dual-Core (SU4100); Intel Core 2 Duo (SU7300); (Soldered) | GS45 | GT335M (1GB); (Soldered) | 2GB, 4GB, and 8GB (2x DDR3 So-DIMM) | 1x 2.5" SATA | | Realtek ALC665 | 63Wh Lithium-Ion (8 cell) | |
| M11x-R2 (Late 2010) | 11.6": (1366x768) | 1st Gen Intel Core i ULV: i3-U330; i5-U470; i5-U520; i7-U640; i7-U680; (Soldered) | QS57 | GT335M (1GB); (Soldered) | 2GB, 4GB, and 8GB (2x DDR3 So-DIMM) | 1x 2.5" SATA | | | 63Wh Lithium-Ion (8 cell) | |
| M11x-R3 (2011) | 11.6": (1366x768) | 2nd Gen Intel Core i ULV: i3-2357M; i5-2467M; i5-2537M; i7-2617M; i7-2637M; (Soldered) | QS67 | GT540M (1GB or 2GB); (Soldered) | 2GB, 4GB, and 8GB (2x DDR3 So-DIMM) | 1x 2.5" SATA | | | 63Wh Lithium-Ion (8 cell) | |
13 Inch
| Alienware 13 | 13.3": (1366x768); (1920x1080); (2560x1440 touch); (3200x1800 touch) | 4th/5th Gen Intel Core i5 5th Gen Intel Core i7 (Soldered) | | GTX 860M (2GB); GTX 960M (2GB); (Soldered) | 8GB, 12GB, and 16GB (2x DDR3L So-DIMM) | | | Realtek ALC3234 w/ Creative Sound Blaster X-Fi MB3 | 51Wh Lithium-Polymer (4 cell); 62Wh Lithium-Polymer (4 cell) | |
| Alienware 13 R2 | 13.3": (1366x768); (1920x1080); (3200x1800 touch) | 6th Gen Intel Core i5/i7 (Soldered) | | GTX 960M (2GB); (Soldered) | 8GB, 12GB, and 16GB (2x DDR3L So-DIMM) | | | Realtek ALC3234 w/ Creative Sound Blaster X-Fi MB3 | 51Wh Lithium-Polymer (4 cell); 62Wh Lithium-Polymer (4 cell) | |
| Alienware 13 R3 | 13.3": (1366x768); (1920x1080); (2560x1440 touch) | 6th Gen Intel Core i5/i7: i5-6300HQ; i7-6700HQ; 7th Gen Intel Core i5/i7: i5-7300HQ; i7-7700HQ; (Soldered) | HM170 HM175 | GTX 1050M (2GB); GTX 1050 Ti Mobile (4GB); GTX 1060M (6GB); (Soldered) | 8GB, 16GB, and 32GB (2x DDR4 So-DIMM) | 2x M.2 2280 (3.0) | | Realtek ALC3266 | 76Wh Lithium-Polymer (4 cell) | |
14 Inch
| M14x (2011) | 14": (1366x768); (1600x900) | 2nd Gen Intel Core i5/i7 (Socket G2) | HM67 | GT 555M (1.5GB/3GB); (Soldered) | 2GB, 4GB, and 8GB (2x DDR3 So-DIMM) | 1x 2.5" SATA; 1x SATA Slim ODD | | Realtek ALC665-GR | 63Wh Lithium-Ion (8 cell) | |
| M14x-R2 (2012) | 14": (1366x768); (1600x900) | 2nd Gen Intel Core i5 3rd Gen Intel Core i5/i7 (Socket G2) | HM77 | GT 650M (1GB/2GB); (Soldered) | 2GB, 4GB, and 8GB (2x DDR3 So-DIMM) | 1x mSATA; 1x 2.5" SATA; 1x SATA Slim ODD | | Creative Sound Blaster Recon3Di High-Definition 5.1 | 63Wh Lithium-Ion (8 cell) | |
| Alienware 14 (2013) | 14": (1366x768); (1920x1080) | 4th Gen Intel Core i5/i7 (Socket G3) | HM87 | GT 750M (1GB); GTX 675M (2GB); (Soldered) | 8GB, 12GB, and 16GB (2x DDR3L So-DIMM) | 1x mSATA; 1x 2.5" SATA; 1x SATA Slim ODD | | Realtek ALC3661 | 69Wh Lithium-Ion (6 cell) | |
| Alienware x14 (2022) | 14": (1920x1080) | 12th Gen Intel Core i5/i7: i5-12500H; i7-12700H; (Soldered) | (SOC) | RTX 3050M (4GB); RTX 3050 Ti Mobile (4GB); RTX 3060M (6GB); (Soldered) | 16GB LP-DDR5 4800MHz (RTX 3050); 16GB/32GB LP-DDR5 5200MHz (RTX 3050); (Soldered) | 1x M.2 2230 (3.0); 1x M.2 2280 (4.0) | Killer AX1690i AX211 | Realtek ALC3281-CG | 80.5Wh Lithium-Ion (6 cell) | |
15 Inch
| M15x (2009) | 15.6": (1600x900); (1920x1080) | 1st Gen Intel Core i3/i5/i7 (Socket G1) | PM55 | (MXM 3.0B) | 2GB, 4GB, and 8GB (2x DDR3 So-DIMM) | 1x 2.5" SATA; 1x SATA Slim ODD | | IDT 92HD83 | 57Wh Lithium-Ion (6 cell); 86Wh Lithium-Ion (9 cell) | |
| Alienware 15 (2015) | 15.6": (1920x1080); (3840x2160 Touch) | 4th Gen Intel Core i5/i7 (Soldered) | HM87 | GTX 965M (2GB); GTX 970M (3GB); GTX 980M (4GB); R9 M295X (4GB); (Soldered) | 8GB, 12GB, and 16GB (2x DDR3L So-DIMM) | 1x 2.5" SATA; 2x M.2 2280 (3.0) | | Creative Sound Core3D-EX w/Creative Sound Blaster X-Fi MB3 | 92Wh Lithium-Ion (8 cell) | |
| Alienware 15 R2 (2015) | 15.6": (1920x1080); (3840x2160 Touch) | 6th Gen Intel Core i5/i7 (Soldered) | HM170 | GTX 970M (3GB); GTX 980M (4GB); (Soldered) | 8GB - 32GB 2133Mhz (2x DDR4 So-DIMM) | 1x 2.5" SATA; 2x M.2 2280 (3.0) | | Creative Sound Core 3D w/SBX Pro Studio | 92Wh Lithium-Ion (8 cell) | |
| Alienware 15 R3 (2016) | 15.6": (1920x1080@60 Hz); (1920x1080@120 Hz); (3840x2160@60 Hz) | 6th Gen Intel Core i5/i7: i5-6300HQ; i7-6700HQ; i7-6820HK; 7th Gen Intel Core i7: i7-7700HQ; i7-7820HK; (Soldered) | CM236 CM238 | RX 470 (6GB); GTX 1060M (6GB); GTX 1070M (8GB); GTX 1080M (8GB); (Soldered) | 8GB - 32GB 2666Mhz (2x DDR4 So-DIMM) | 1x M.2 2242 (3.0); 2x M.2 2280 (3.0); 1x 2.5" SATA | | Realtek ALC3266 | 68Wh Lithium-Ion (4 cell); 99Wh Lithium-Ion (6 cell) | |
| Alienware 15 R4 (2018) | 15.6": (1920x1080@60 Hz); (1920x1080@120 Hz); (3840x2160@60 Hz) | 8th Gen Intel Core i5/i7/i9: i5-8300H; i7-8750H; i9-8950HK; (Soldered) | CM246 | RX 570 (6GB); GTX 1060M (6GB); GTX 1070M (8GB); GTX 1080 Max-Q (8GB); (Soldered) | 8GB - 64GB 2666Mhz (2x DDR4 So-DIMM) | 1x M.2 2242 (3.0); 2x M.2 2280 (3.0); 1x 2.5" SATA | | Realtek ALC3266 | 68Wh Lithium-Ion (4 cell); 99Wh Lithium-Ion (6 cell) | |
| Alienware M15 (2018) | 15.6": (1920x1080); (3840x2160) | 8th Gen Intel Core i5/i7/i9 9th Gen Intel Core i7 (Soldered) | HM370 | GTX 1050 Ti Mobile (4GB); GTX 1060M (6GB); GTX 1070 Max-Q (8GB); GTX 1660 Ti Mobile (6GB); RTX 2060M (6GB); RTX 2070 Max-Q (8GB); RTX 2080 Max-Q (8GB); (Soldered) | 8GB, 16GB, and 32GB (2x DDR4 So-DIMM) | 2x M.2 2280 (3.0); 1x 2.5" SATA (Optional) | | Realtek ALC3281-CG | 60Wh Lithium-Ion (4 cell); 90Wh Lithium-Ion (6 cell) | |
| Alienware M15 R2 (2019) | | | | | | | | | | |
| Alienware M15 R3 (2020) | | | | | | | | | | |
| Alienware M15 R4 (Early 2021) | | | | | | | | | | |
| Alienware M15 R5 (Mid 2021) | | | | | | | | | | |
| Alienware M15 R6 (Mid 2021) | | | | | | | | | | |
| Alienware M15 R7 (2022) | | | | | | | | | | |
| Alienware x15 (2021) | | | | | | | | | | |
| Alienware x15 R2 (2022) | | | | | | | | | | |
16 Inch
| Alienware m16 (2023) | | | | | | | | | | |
| Alienware 16 Aurora | | | | | | | | | | |
| Alienware 16X Aurora | | | | | | | | | | |
17 Inch
| Alienware M17x (2009) | 17.3": (1440x900); (1920x1200) | Intel Core 2 Duo/Quad (Socket P) | Nvidia GeForce 9400M G | (2x MXM 3.0B) | 4GB, 6GB, and 8GB (2x DDR3 So-DIMM) | 2x 2.5" SATA; 1x SATA Slim ODD | | IDT 92HD73 | 86Wh Lithium-Ion (9 cell) | |
| Alienware M17x-R2 (2010) | 17.3": (1440x900); (1920x1200) | 1st Gen Intel Core i5/i7 (Socket G1) | PM55 | (2x MXM 3.0B) | 4GB, 6GB, and 8GB (2x DDR3 So-DIMM) | 2x 2.5" SATA; 1x SATA Slim ODD | | IDT 92HD73 | 86Wh Lithium-Ion (9 cell) | |
| Alienware M17x-R3 (2011) | 17.3": (1600x900); (1920x1080); (1920x1080@120 Hz 3D) | 2nd Gen Intel Core i5/i7 (Socket G2) | HM67 | GTX 460M (1.5GB); HD 6870M (1GB); HD 6970M (2GB); (MXM 3.0B) | 8GB, 12GB, 16GB, 24GB, and 32GB (4x DDR3 So-DIMM) | 2x 2.5" SATA; 1x mSATA; 1x SATA Slim ODD | | IDT 92HD73 | 90Wh Lithium-Ion (9 cell) | |
| Alienware M17x-R4 (2012) | 17.3": (1600x900); (1920x1080); (1920x1080@120 Hz 3D) | 2nd/3rd Gen Intel Core i5/i7 (Socket G2) | HM77 | GTX 660M (1GB); GTX 675M (2GB); GTX 680M (2GB); HD 7970M (2GB); (MXM 3.0B) | 8GB, 12GB, 16GB, 24GB, and 32GB (4x DDR3 So-DIMM) | 2x 2.5" SATA; 1x mSATA; 1x SATA Slim ODD | | Intel High-Definition 5.1 | 90Wh Lithium-Ion (9 cell) | |
| Alienware 17 (M17x-R5) (2013) | 17.3": (1600x900); (1920x1080); (1920x1080@120 Hz 3D) | 4th Gen Intel Core i5/i7 (Socket G3) | HM87 | GTX 765M; GTX 770M; GTX 780M; (MXM 3.0B) | 8GB, 12GB, 16GB, 24GB, and 32GB (4x DDR3L So-DIMM) | 2x 2.5" SATA; 1x mSATA; 1x SATA Slim ODD | | Realtek ALC3661 | 86Wh Lithium-Ion (8 cell) | |
| Alienware 17 R2 (2015) | 17.3": (1920x1080); (3840x2160 Touch) | 4th Gen Intel Core i5/i7 (Soldered) | HM87 | GTX 965M (2GB); GTX 970M (3GB); GTX 980M (4GB); R9 M295X (4GB); (Soldered) | 8GB, 12GB, and 16GB (2x DDR3L So-DIMM) | 1x 2.5" SATA; 2x M.2 2280 (3.0) | | Creative Sound Core3D-EX w/Creative Sound Blaster X-Fi MB3 | 92Wh Lithium-Ion (8 cell) | |
| Alienware 17 R3 (2015) | 17.3": (1920x1080); (3840x2160) | 6th Gen Intel Core i5/i7 (Soldered) | HM170 | GTX 970M (3GB); GTX 980M (4GB); (Soldered) | 8GB - 32GB 2133Mhz (2x DDR4 So-DIMM) | 1x 2.5" SATA; 2x M.2 2280 (3.0) | | Creative Sound Core 3D w/SBX Pro Studio | 92Wh Lithium-Ion (8 cell) | |
| Alienware 17 R4 (2016) | 17.3": (1920x1080@60 Hz); (2560x1440@120 Hz); (3840x2160@60 Hz) | 6th Gen Intel Core i5/i7: i5-6300HQ; i7-6700HQ; i7-6820HK; 7th Gen Intel Core i7: i7-7700HQ; i7-7820HK; (Soldered) | CM236 CM238 | RX 470 (6GB); GTX 1060M (6GB); GTX 1070M (8GB); GTX 1080M (8GB); (Soldered) | 8GB - 32GB 2666Mhz (2x DDR4 So-DIMM) | 1x M.2 2242 (3.0); 2x M.2 2280 (3.0); 1x 2.5" SATA | | Realtek ALC3266 | 68Wh Lithium-Ion (4 cell); 99Wh Lithium-Ion (6 cell) | |
| Alienware 17 R5 (2018) | 17.3": (1920x1080); (2560x1440); (3840x2160) | 8th Gen Intel Core i5/i7/i9: i5-8300H; i7-8750H; i9-8950HK; (Soldered) | CM246 | RX 570 (6GB); GTX 1060M (6GB); GTX 1070M (8GB); GTX 1080 Max-Q (8GB); (Soldered) | 8GB - 64GB 2666Mhz (2x DDR4 So-DIMM) | 1x M.2 2242 (3.0); 2x M.2 2280 (3.0); 1x 2.5" SATA | | Realtek ALC3266 | 68Wh Lithium-Ion (4 cell); 99Wh Lithium-Ion (6 cell) | |
| Alienware M17 (2018) | 17.3": (1920x1080); (3840x2160) | 8th Gen Intel Core i5/i7/i9 9th Gen Intel Core i7 (Soldered) | HM370 | GTX 1050 Ti Mobile (4GB); GTX 1060M (6GB); GTX 1070 Max-Q (8GB); GTX 1660 Ti Mobile (6GB); RTX 2060M (6GB); RTX 2070 Max-Q (8GB); RTX 2080 Max-Q (8GB); (Soldered) | 8GB - 32GB 2666Mhz (2x DDR4 So-DIMM) | 2x M.2 2280 (3.0); 1x 2.5" SATA (Optional) | | Realtek ALC3281-CG | 60Wh Lithium-Ion (4 cell); 90Wh Lithium-Ion (6 cell) | |
| Alienware M17 R2 (2019) | 17.3": (1920x1080@60 Hz); (1920x1080@144 Hz) | 9th Gen Intel Core i5/i7/i9 (Soldered) | HM370 | GTX 1650M (4GB); GTX 1660 Ti Mobile (6GB); RTX 2060M (6GB); RTX 2070 Max-Q (8GB); RTX 2080 Max-Q (8GB); (Soldered) | 8GB DDR4 2666Mhz; 16GB DDR4 2666Mhz; (Soldered) | 2x M.2 2280 (3.0) | | Realtek ALC3281-CG | 90Wh Lithium-Ion (6 cell) | |
| Alienware M17 R3 (2020) | 17.3": (1920x1080@144 Hz); (1920x1080@300 Hz); (3840x2160@60 Hz) | 10th Gen Intel Core i5/i7/i9: i5-10300H; i7-10750H; i9-10980HK; (Soldered) | HM470 | GTX 1650 Ti Mobile (4GB); GTX 1660 Ti Mobile (6GB); RTX 2060M (6GB); RTX 2070M (8GB); RTX 2070 Super Mobile (8GB); RTX 2080 Super Mobile (8GB); RX 5500M (4GB); (Soldered) | 8GB DDR4 2666Mhz; 16GB DDR4 2666Mhz; 32GB DDR4 2666Mhz; (Soldered) | 2x M.2 2280 (3.0); 1x M.2 2230 (3.0) | | Realtek ALC3281-CG | 56Wh Lithium-Ion (4 cell); 86Wh Lithium-Ion (6 cell) | |
| Alienware M17 R4 (2021) | | | | | | | | | | |
| Alienware M17 R5 (2022) | | | | | | | | | | |
| Alienware X17 (2021) | | | | | | | | | | |
| Alienware X17 R2 (2022) | | | | | | | | | | |
| Alienware Area 51m (2019) | 17.3": (1920x1080@60 Hz); (1920x1080@144 Hz) | 8th/9th Gen Intel Core i7/i9 (Socket LGA1151) | Z390 | GTX 1660 Ti Mobile (6GB); RTX 2060M (6GB); RTX 2070M (8GB); RTX 2080M (8GB); (DGFF) | 8GB - 64GB 2400Mhz (2933Mhz XMP) (4x DDR4 So-DIMM) | 2x M.2 2280 (3.0); 1x 2.5" SATA | | Realtek ALC3282-CG | 90Wh Lithium-Ion (6 cell) | |
| Alienware Area 51m R2 (2020) | 17.3": (1920x1080@144 Hz); (1920x1080@300 Hz); (3840x2160@60 Hz) | 10th Gen Intel Core i7/i9 (Socket LGA1200) | Z490 | GTX 1660 Ti Mobile (6GB); RTX 2060M (6GB); RTX 2070 Super Mobile (8GB); RTX 2080 Super Mobile (8GB); RX 5700M (8GB); (DGFF) | 8GB - 64GB 2933Mhz (3200Mhz XMP) (2x DDR4 So-DIMM) | 1x M.2 2230 (3.0); 1x M.2 2280 (3.0); 2x M.2 2280 (3.0)/1x 2.5" SATA | | Realtek ALC3282-CG | 90Wh Lithium-Ion (6 cell) | |

=== Desktops ===
Aurora

- Aurora R1 – This model was based on the Intel's X58 platform (LGA 1366 Socket). It shared identical hardware with the Aurora ALX R1. The Aurora R1 is equipped with 1st Gen Intel Core i7 and i7 Extreme processors. In order of model number: 920, 930, 940, 950, 960, 965, 975 (quad core), 980X, 990X (six core). Sealed liquid cooling units for the processors came factory installed. The R1 used triple channel memory and had dedicated graphics card options from AMD's HD 5000 series line as well as Nvidia GeForce 400 series and Nvidia GeForce 500 series line. Power supply options included 525 W, 875 W, and 1000 W output power. Both SLI and CrossFireX were supported.
- Aurora R2 – This was the second revision of the Aurora, and the first Alienware desktop to be sold in retail chains such as Best Buy. It was based on Intel's P55 platform (LGA 1156 Socket). Processors include the Core i5 and i7 (first generation Lynnfield quad core only). In order of model number: i5-750, i5-760, i7-860, i7-870, i7-875 and i7-880. Sealed liquid cooling units for the processors came factory installed. The R2 used dual channel memory and had dedicated graphics card options including AMD Radeon HD 5000 series, Nvidia GeForce 400 series and Nvidia GeForce 500 series. Power supply options were 525 W or 875 W. Both SLI and CrossFireX were supported.
- Aurora R3 – This was the third revision of the Aurora. It was based on Intel's P67 platform (LGA 1155 Socket). Processors included Core i5 and i7 processors only (second generation quad core Sandy Bridge). In order of model number: i5-2300, i5-2400, i5-2500, i5-2500K, i7-2600, i7-2600K. Sealed liquid cooling units for the processors came factory installed. The R3 used dual channel memory and had dedicated graphics card options including AMD Radeon HD 5000 series and Radeon HD 5000 series as well as Nvidia GeForce 400 series and Nvidia GeForce 500 series. Power supply options were 525 W and 875 W. Both SLI and CrossFireX were supported.
- Aurora R4 – This is the fourth revision of the Aurora. It is based on Intel's X79 platform (LGA 2011 socket). This model shares identical hardware with the Aurora ALX (R4). Processors include Core i7 processors only (third generation quad core and hexacore Sandy Bridge Extreme). In order of model number: i7-3820, i7-3930K (six core) and i7-3960X (six core). Sealed liquid cooling units for the processors came factory installed. The R4 is the first to use quad channel memory and has Dedicated graphics card options including AMD Radeon HD 6000 series and Radeon HD 7000 series as well as Nvidia GeForce 500 series. Nvidia GeForce 600 series were added later in the year. Power supply options were 525 W and 875 W. Both SLI and CrossFireX were supported. The optional ALX chassis offered thermal controlled venting, tool-less/wireless hard drive bays, internal theater lighting and an extra array of external LEDs. Coupled with the TactX keyboard and mouse it offered up to 25 billion lighting color combinations.
- Aurora R5 – The fifth revision of the Aurora was announced on June 13, 2016, and was available to purchase June 14, 2016. The updated Aurora was given a facelift and ergonomic handle on the top of the case and is the first of its kind to offer tool-less upgrades to graphics cards, hard drives, and memory. The Aurora was being marketed as being VR ready out of the box, even so far as being HTC Vive Optimized and Oculus Certified. The base model was released with an MSRP of US$799.99 and adding all the extra hardware can cost the consumer up to US$4,189.99. The processor options are Intel based; i3-6100, i5-6400, i5-6600K, i7-6700, and i7-6700K. The Aurora R5 was released during the transitioning phase between the GeForce 900 series and GeForce 10 series graphics cards, and the list was extensive; GTX 950 with 2 GB GDDR5, GTX 960 with 2 GB GDDR5, GTX 970 with 4 GB GDDR5, GTX 980 with 4 GB GDDR5, and the GTX 980 Ti with 6 GB GDDR5, all of which could also be put in SLI. Alienware, however, would only allow one GTX 1070 with 8 GB GDDR5 or one GTX 1080 with 8 GB GDDR5X to be installed at launch. Consumers were also allowed to purchase but one GPU from AMD, the Radeon R9 370 with 4 GB GDDR5 (CrossFire R9 370 was optional). PSU choices were 460 W or 850 W, or a liquid cooled 850 W PSU. Hard drive and SSD options ranged from 1 TB and 256 GB, respectively to 2 TB and 1 TB, respectively. RAM was available at launch between 8–64 GB of DDR4 all clocked at 2133 MHz.
- Aurora R6 – The sixth revision was announced on February 22, 2017. According to Windows Central, "The Aurora R6 is only a mild refresh over the previous generation R5, with the main attraction being the new 7th Generation Kaby Lake processors from Intel." There are dozens of factory-built combinations possible. Four processors to choose from i5-7400, i5-7600k, i7-7700, i7-7700k. Video cards offered include AMD RX 460, 470, 480, Nvidia GeForce GTX 1050 Ti, 1060, 1070, 1080, 1080 Ti (11 GB), Titan X (12 GB), Dual RX 460 (Crossfire Enabled), Dual GTX 1070 (SLI Enabled), Dual GTX 1080 (SLI Enabled), Dual GTX 1080 Ti (SLI Enabled), Dual GTX Titan X (SLI Enabled). Memory options start at 8 GB and max out at 64 GB. Factory-installed storage can be a single drive (7200 RPM drive or PCIe SSD) or dual drive including both. Standard PSU or one with liquid cooling in 450 W or 850 W is offered in Aurora R6.
- Aurora R7 – The Aurora R7 included 8th Gen Intel Cores.
- Aurora R8 – The Aurora R8 included 9th Gen Intel Cores.
- Aurora R9 – The Aurora R9 was first made available to purchase August 20, 2019. It comes in both Lunar Light and Dark Side of the Moon color options.
- Aurora R10 – The Aurora R10 features AMD's Ryzen CPUs.
- Aurora R11 – The Aurora is similar to the R10 but with Intel CPUs. The R11 was released on May 13, 2020.
- Aurora R12 – The Aurora R12 Was available to purchase on March 19, 2021. It had the Intel 11th Gen Cores.
- Aurora R13 – The Aurora R13 became available to purchase on October 27, 2021. It brought in several new features and specifications, including more decoration, a bigger chassis for more airflow, and higher available specs. The R13 has several options for design available, including a clear side panel on the left side of the machine, letting you view all the RGB inside, along with an added bar at the top of the panel inside, featuring the word "Alienware", in RGB. The R13 also made available the RTX 3070, 3070 Ti, 3080, 3080 Ti, and 3090, leading to increased performance, and bringing in the newer 12th gen Alder Lake intel core i9. This system also brought the CryoTech cooling option, which was influenced from an Alienware employees rant about the Intel chip's heat problem, influencing the engineers to make a solution. (Default color is Static Blue)
- Aurora R14 – The Aurora R14 is nearly identical to the R13, with the only difference being that the R14 is for AMD processors, not Intel processors. (Default color is Static Red)
- Aurora R15 – The Aurora R15 was released on November 10, 2022. This was a more incremental release, as the major changes are upgrades of components (such as the upgrade to 13th generation Intel Core processors, and 40 series Nvidia GeForce RTX GPUs.) Additionally, half of the side panel was replaced with venting to improve airflow. Another version of the R15 was released that resembles the R14, as the Intel Core processors are swapped with AMD Ryzen processors.

Aurora ALX

- ALX (R1) – This model is based on the Intel's X58 platform (LGA 1366 socket). This model shared the identical hardware with the Aurora R1. The ALX R1 is equipped with 1st generation Intel Core i7 and i7 Extreme processors. In order of model number: 920, 930, 940, 950, 960, 965, 975 (quad core), 980X, 990X (six core). Sealed liquid cooling units for the processors came factory installed. The R1 used triple channel memory and had graphics card options from AMD's Radeon HD 5000 series, Nvidia's GeForce 400 series and Nvidia's GeForce 500 series line. Power supply options included 525 W or 875 W. Power supply and motherboard supports both SLI and CrossFireX. The ALX (X58 platform) was offered from the beginning alongside the Aurora R1, R2 and R3. It offered thermal controlled venting, toolless/wireless hard drive bays, internal theater lighting and an extra array of external LEDs. Coupled with the TactX keyboard and mouse it offered up to 25 billion lighting color combinations.

Area-51

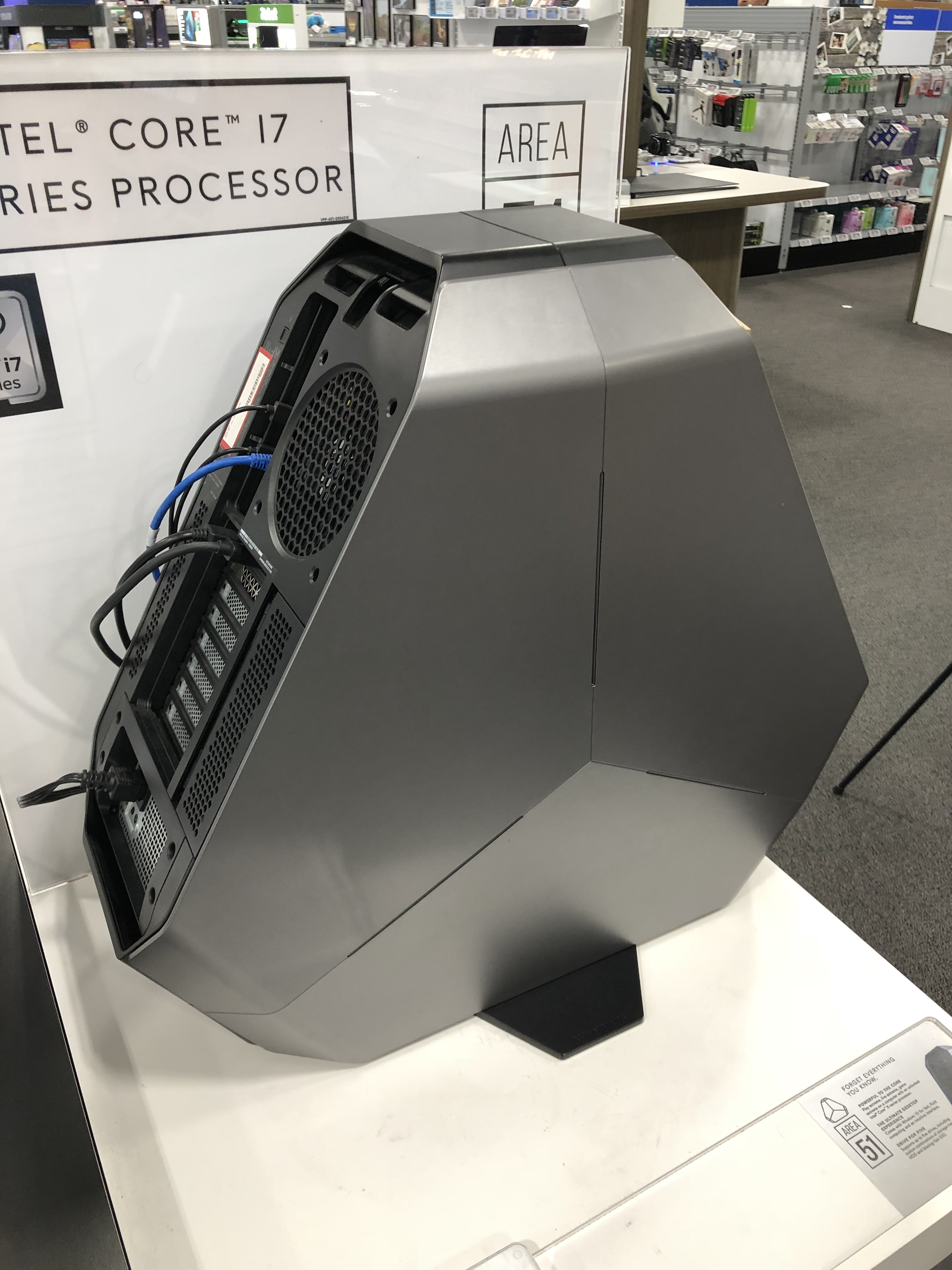
Area-51 ALX R1

- Area-51 R1 – This model is based on the Intel X58 platform (LGA 1366 socket). This model shares identical hardware with the Area 51 ALX. The Area-51 R1 is equipped with 1st Gen Intel Core i7 and i7 Extreme processors. In order of model number: 920, 930, 940, 950, 960, 975 (quad core), 980X, 990X (six core). The Area 51 used triple channel memory and had graphics card options from AMD's Radeon HD 5000 series, Radeon HD 6000 series and Nvidia's GeForce 400 series and GeForce 500 series. Power Supply options included 1000 W or 1100 W. Power supply and motherboard supports both SLI and CrossFireX. The Area 51 was offered from the beginning alongside the Aurora R1, R2, R3 and the Aurora ALX (R1). It offered thermal-controlled active venting, tool-less hard drive bays, internal theater lighting and an array of external LEDs. Area-51 was offered in either semi-gloss black or lunar shadow (silver) finishes, with a non-motorized front push-panel. Command Center software and AlienFX features are offered via a discrete master I/O daughterboard.
- Area-51 ALX R1 – Alienware's most expensive desktop to date ($5000–$7000 US fully equipped), ALX offered every available option as the standard model (see above); ALX is distinguished from the standard model by its matte black anodized aluminium chassis, and motorized front panel powered by a dedicated ALX-specific master I/O daughterboard.
- Area-51 R2 – unveiled late August 2014 – available October 2014; newly redesigned Triad chassis; Intel x99 Chipset, support for socket LGA 2011-3 Intel Haswell-E processors; 2133 MHz DDR4 memory; up to 1500 W power supply; support for 3-way/4-way SLI graphics; liquid cooling and the return of Command Center 4.0 with AlienFX/overclocking features via front I/O daughterboard.
- Area-51 R3
- Area-51 R4 – The fourth revision of the Area-51 was announced at the E3 2017 trade event. The base model was released with an MSRP of US$1899.99 and adding all the extra hardware can cost the consumer up to US$6,659.99. The Area 51 R4 is based on the Intel X299 chipset and the processor options include Intel based; Core i7-7800X, Core i7-7820X, Core i9-7900X Core i9-7920X, Core i9-7960X and Core i9-7980XE. Memory options include 8 GB, 16 GB, 32 GB or 64 GB DDR4 2400 MHz memory or 8 GB, 16 GB or 32 GB of HyperX DDR4 2933 MHz memory (64 GB kits sold separately). The Area-51 R4 was configurable with Nvidia GeForce 10 series, AMD RX Vega series or AMD Radeon 500 series graphics cards. Video cards offered include AMD RX 580, RX Vega 64, Nvidia GeForce GTX 1050 Ti, 1060, 1070, 1080, 1080 Ti (11 GB), liquid cooled 1080 (8 GB), Dual GTX 1070 (SLI Enabled), Dual GTX 1070 Ti (SLI Enabled), Dual GTX 1080 (SLI Enabled), Dual GTX 1080 Ti (SLI Enabled), triple AMD Radeon RX 570 or RX 580. Available PSU choices were 850 W or 1500 W. Storage options ranged from a 2 TB hard drive, 128 GB M.2 SATA, or 256 GB to 1 TB M.2 PCIe SSD.

Area-51 Threadripper Edition

- Area-51 R4 – The fourth revision of the Area-51 was announced at E3 2017, and the first Area-51 model to be sold with AMD Ryzen Threadripper processors. The base model was released with an MSRP of US$2399.99 and adding all the extra hardware can cost the consumer up to US$5,799.99. The Area 51 R4 Threadripper Edition is based on the AMD X399 chipset and the processor options include Ryzen Threadripper 1900X, 1920X and 1950X. Memory options include 8 GB, 16 GB, 32 GB or 64 GB DDR4 2400 MHz memory or 8 GB, 16 GB, 32 GB or 64 GB of HyperX DDR4 2933 MHz memory. The Area-51 R4 was configurable with Nvidia GeForce 10 series or AMD RX 580 graphics cards, which include; GTX 1060 6 GB, GTX 1070 8 GB, GTX 1070 Ti 8 GB, GTX 1080 8 GB, GTX 1080 Ti 11 GB, or an AMD RX 580 8 GB. Available PSU choices were 850 W or 1500 W. Storage options ranged from a 2 TB hard drive, 128 GB M.2 SATA, or 256 GB to 1 TB M.2 PCIe SSD.

X51

- R1 – A console-like small form factor PC that used an external power supply and Mini-ITX motherboard. This model is equipped with a choice of 2nd or 3rd Gen Intel Core processors and Nvidia GeForce 500 or 600 series GPUs. Full-size reference (blower) design GPUs (two-slot) could be used as long as the TDP was within specification. The maximum amount of RAM was dual-channel 16GB DDR3 SDRAM running at 1600Mhz.
- R2 – R2 power board increased external power supply capacity up to 330W (330W PSU build to order option only, 240W PSU was still standard). This model also introduced options for 4th Gen Intel Core processors and Nvidia GeForce 700 series or AMD Radeon 200 series GPUs.
- R3 – This model is equipped with 6th Gen Intel Core processors and Nvidia GeForce 900 series GPUs. Adding a dedicated port on the back for the graphics amplifier. It also included the (build to order) option of OEM CPU water cooling for the first time in the X51.

=== Alienware Alpha ===
- Alienware Alpha / Alienware Steam Machine – A PC/console hybrid introduced in 2014. It shipped with Windows 8 and a wireless Xbox 360. Steam Machine variant was released in 2015, shipping with a version of the (at the time) Debian-based SteamOS; Windows could also be installed after purchase. It contains a custom-built Nvidia GeForce GTX 860M; a Core i3, i5, or i7 Intel Processor, depending on what model is purchased, up to 8 GB of RAM; and between 500 GB and 2 TB of hard drive space.
- Alienware Alpha R2 / Alienware Steam Machine R2 – Alienware's update to the small form factor released on June 13, 2016. It contains (depending on customer choice) an AMD Radeon R9 M470X GPU with 2 GB GDDR5 memory or an NVIDIA GeForce GTX 960 GPU with 4 GB GDDR5. The processor line chosen this rendition are 6th generation Intel processors; the i3-6100T, i5-6400T, or i7-6700T. The RAM from factory comes in either 1 stick of 8 GB or 16 GB configurations of DDR4 memory clocked at 2133 MHz, and the system comes with one SO-DIMM slot. Hard-drive options have been expanded to include a HDD, SSD, or both. The HDD comes in one size, 1 TB at 7200 RPM, whilst the SSD is available in the M.2 mini-PCIe standard ranging in sizes between 256 GB to 1 TB. The new console also has a Graphics Amplifier slot with all models except the AMD Radeon R9 M470X equipped variant. The console ships with Windows 10, and the Steam Machine with SteamOS.

=== Headsets ===
- Alienware AW988 (2017) • 7.1 virtual surround sound via USB and AWCC. • Weight: 380 g • Wireless connectivity • Wired connectivity (USB and jack) • Customizable RGB lighting • Detachable noise-canceling microphone
- Alienware AW510H (2019) • 7.1 virtual surround sound via USB and AWCC. • Weight: 370 g • Wired connectivity (USB and jack) • Comfort-focused design with memory foam earpads • Target Market: Customers looking for satisfactory performance.
- Alienware AW310H (2019) • Wired connectivity (Only supports jack) • Weight: 350 g • 50 mm high-resolution drivers • Flip-up boom microphone • Lightweight and durable construction • Only connects via 3.5 mm jack, making it a stereo-only headset. • Target Market: Customers looking for confort and an economic model.
- AW920H (2022) • Weight: 300 g • Dolby Atmos® Virtual Surround Sound • Wireless connectivity. • Wired connectivity (USB and jack) • Customizable RGB lighting • Headset touch controls
- AW720H (2023) • Wireless connectivity. • Wired connectivity (USB and jack) • Weight: 348 g • This headset has mostly the same features as AW920H but instead of having a touch control system there are buttons.
- AW520H (2023) • Weight: 337 g • Wired connectivity (USB and jack) • This headset has mostly the same features as AW720H, except the AW520H has no wireless capability.

=== Monitors ===
- AW3821DW
- AW3423DW
- AW3423DWF
- AW2721D
- AW2723DF
- AW2524H
- AW2523HF
- AW2725DF
- AW3225QF

Alienware monitors use a standard naming convention system for its product names.

- First two characters: Represents that it is an Alienware monitor, typically AW.
- Characters three and four: Represents the screen size.
- Characters five and six: Represents the release year.

The ending characters represent a mix of features, as follows.

- H=1080p resolution
- D=1440p resolution
- Q=4K resolution
- W=Ultrawide
- G=NVIDIA G-Sync support
- F=AMD FreeSync support

== See also ==
- List of computer system manufacturers
