= List of Nvidia graphics processing units =

This list contains general information about graphics processing units (GPUs) and video cards from Nvidia, based on official specifications. In addition some Nvidia motherboards come with integrated onboard GPUs. Limited/special/collectors' editions or AIB versions are not included. Please do not edit the tables to match your specific AIB model.

== Field explanations ==
The fields in the table listed below describe the following:

- Model – The marketing name for the processor, assigned by Nvidia.
- Launch Date – Date of release for the processor.
- Code Name – The internal engineering codename for the processor (typically designated by an NVXY name and later GXY where X is the series number and Y is the schedule of the project for that generation).
- Fab – Fabrication process. Average feature size of components of the processor.
- Bus interface – Bus by which the graphics processor is attached to the system (typically an expansion slot, such as PCI, AGP, or PCI-Express).
- Memory – The amount of graphics memory available to the processor.
- Base Clock – The factory core clock frequency; while some manufacturers adjust clocks lower and higher, this number will always be the reference clocks used by Nvidia.
- Memory Clock – The factory effective memory clock frequency (while some manufacturers adjust clocks lower and higher, this number will always be the reference clocks used by Nvidia). All DDR/GDDR memories operate at half this frequency, except for GDDR5, which operates at one quarter of this frequency.
- Core Config – The layout of the graphics pipeline, in terms of functional units. Over time the number, type, and variety of functional units in the GPU core has changed significantly; before each section in the list there is an explanation as to what functional units are present in each generation of processors. In later models, shaders are integrated into a unified shader architecture, where any one shader can perform any of the functions listed.
- Fillrate – Maximum theoretical fill rate in textured pixels per second. This number is generally used as a maximum throughput number for the GPU and generally, a higher fill rate corresponds to a more powerful (and faster) GPU.
- Memory subsection
  - Bandwidth – Maximum theoretical bandwidth for the processor at factory clock with factory bus width. GHz = 10^{9} Hz.
  - Bus type – Type of memory bus or buses used.
  - Bus width – Maximum bit width of the memory bus or buses used. This will always be a factory bus width.
- API support section
  - Direct3D – Maximum version of Direct3D fully supported.
  - OpenGL – Maximum version of OpenGL fully supported.
  - OpenCL – Maximum version of OpenCL fully supported.
  - Vulkan – Maximum version of Vulkan fully supported.
  - CUDA - Maximum version of Cuda fully supported.
- Features – Added features that are not standard as a part of the two graphics libraries.

== Desktop GPUs ==
=== Pre-GeForce ===
Model	Launch Date	Code Name	Fab (nm)	Transistors (million)	Die Size (mm^{2})	Bus Interface	Clock Rate		Core Config	Memory Configuration				Fillrate		API Support		MSRP (USD)
Model	Launch Date	Code Name	Fab (nm)	Transistors (million)	Die Size (mm^{2})	Bus Interface	Core (MHz)	Memory (MHz)	Core Config	Size (MB)	Bus Type	Bus Width (bit)	Bandwidth (GB/s)	Texel (MT/s)	Pixel (MP/s)	Direct3D	OpenGL	MSRP (USD)
STG-2000	September 30, 1995	NV1	SGS 500 nm	1	135	PCI	75	50	1:1:1	1	FPM	64	0.40	75.0		—N/a	—N/a	$249
NV1	September 30, 1995	NV1	SGS 500 nm	1	135	PCI	75	60	1:1:1	2	EDO	64	0.48	75.0		—N/a	—N/a	$299
Riva 128	April 1, 1997	NV3	SGS 350 nm	4	71	AGP; 1x PCI	100		1:1:1	4	SDR	128	1.60	100		5.0	1.0	$199
Riva 128ZX	February 23, 1998	NV3	SGS 350 nm	4	71	AGP; 2x	100		1:1:1	8	SDR	128	1.60	100		5.0	1.0	$199
Riva TNT	August 31, 1998	NV4	TSMC 350 nm	7	128	AGP; 2x PCI	90	110	2:2:2	8 16	SDR	128	1.76	180		5.0	1.2	$199
Riva Vanta LT	March, 2000	NV6	TSMC 250 nm	15	63	AGP; 2x PCI	80	100	2:2:2	8 16	SDR	64	0.80	160		6.0	1.2	OEM
Riva Vanta	March 12, 1999	NV6	TSMC 250 nm	15	63	AGP; 4x PCI	100	125	2:2:2	8 16	SDR	64	1.00 (Note: Official specifications, real cards could have lower memory clocks)	200		6.0	1.2	$99
Riva TNT2 M64	October, 1999	NV6	TSMC 250 nm	15	63	AGP; 4x PCI	125	150	2:2:2	16 32	SDR	64	1.20	250		6.0	1.2	$119
Riva TNT2	March 12, 1999	NV5	TSMC 250 nm	15	63	AGP; 4x PCI	125	150	2:2:2	16 32	SDR	128	2.40	250		6.0	1.2	$249
Riva TNT2 Pro	October, 1999	NV5	TSMC 250 nm	15	63	AGP; 4x	143	167	2:2:2	32	SDR	128	2.67	286		6.0	1.2	$199
Riva TNT2 Ultra	March 12, 1999	NV5	TSMC 250 nm	15	63	AGP; 4x	150	183	2:2:2	32	SDR	128	2.93	300		6.0	1.2	$299

=== GeForce 256 series ===
- All models are built on the TSMC 220 nm process and support Direct3D 7.0,OpenGL 1.2, hardware Transform, Lighting (T&L), & Cube Environment Mapping.

Model	Launch Date	Code Name	Transistors (million)	Die Size (mm^{2})	Bus Interface	Clock Rate		Core Config	Memory Configuration				Fillrate		MSRP (USD)
Model	Launch Date	Code Name	Transistors (million)	Die Size (mm^{2})	Bus Interface	Core (MHz)	Memory (MHz)	Core Config	Size (MB)	Bus Type	Bus Width (bit)	Bandwidth (GB/s)	Texel (MT/s)	Pixel (MP/s)	MSRP (USD)
GeForce 256 SDR	October 11, 1999	NV10	17	139	AGP; 4x	120	166	4:4:4	32; 64	SDR	128	2.65	480		$199
GeForce 256 DDR	December 13, 1999	NV10	17	139	AGP; 4x	120	150	4:4:4	32; 64	DDR	128	4.80	480		$249

=== GeForce2 series ===
- All models are built on the TSMC 180 nm process and support Direct3D 7.0, TwinView Dual-Display Architecture, Second-Generation Transform and Lighting (T&L), Nvidia Shading Rasterizer (NSR), & High-Definition Video Processor (HDVP).
- All GeForce2 MX models support OpenGL 1.2 & Digital Vibrance Control (DVC).
- All GeForce2 non-MX models support OpenGL 1.5.

Model	Launch Date	Code Name	Fab (nm)	Transistors (million)	Die Size (mm^{2})	Bus Interface	Clock Rate		Core Config	Memory Configuration				Fillrate		MSRP (USD)
Model	Launch Date	Code Name	Fab (nm)	Transistors (million)	Die Size (mm^{2})	Bus Interface	Core (MHz)	Memory (MHz)	Core Config	Size (MB)	Bus Type	Bus Width (bit)	Bandwidth (GB/s)	Texel (MT/s)	Pixel (MP/s)	MSRP (USD)
GeForce2 MX IGP + nForce 220/420	June 4, 2001	NV1A	TSMC 180 nm	20		FSB	175	System shared up to 133	2:4:2	System shared up to32	System shared DDR	System shared 64/128	1.06 2.13	700	350	OEM
GeForce2 MX 200	March 3, 2001	NV11	TSMC 180 nm	20	64	AGP; 4x PCI	175	166	2:4:2	32 64	SDR	64	1.33	700	350	$99
GeForce2 MX	June 28, 2000	NV11	TSMC 180 nm	20	64	AGP; 4x PCI	175	166	2:4:2	32 64	SDR	128	2.67 (Note: Official specifications, real cards could have lower memory clocks and even 64 bit SDR memory bus)	700	350	$119
GeForce2 MX 400	March 3, 2001	NV11	TSMC 180 nm	20	64	AGP; 4x PCI	200	166	2:4:2	32 64	SDR DDR	128 64	2.67	800	400	$129
GeForce2 GTS	April 26, 2000	NV15	TSMC 180 nm	25	88	AGP; 4x	200	166	4:8:4	32 64	DDR	128	5.33	1600	800	$299
GeForce2 Pro	December 5, 2000	NV15	TSMC 180 nm	25	88	AGP; 4x	200	200	4:8:4	32 64	DDR	128	6.40	1600	800	$199
GeForce2 Ti	October 1, 2001	NV15	TSMC 180 nm	25	88	AGP; 4x	250	200	4:8:4	32 64	DDR	128	6.40	2000	1000	$149
GeForce2 Ti VX		NV15	TSMC 180 nm	25	88	AGP; 4x	225	200	4:8:4	64	DDR	128	6.40	2000	1000	
GeForce2 Ultra	August 14, 2000	NV15	TSMC 180 nm	25	88	AGP; 4x	250	230	4:8:4	64	DDR	128	7.36	2000	1000	$499

=== GeForce3 series ===
- All models are built on the TSMC 150 nm process and support Direct3D 8.1, OpenGL 1.5, 3D Textures, Lightspeed Memory Architecture (LMA), nFiniteFX Engine, & Shadow Buffers.

Model	Launch Date	Code Name	Transistors (million)	Die Size (mm^{2})	Bus Interface	Clock Rate		Core Config	Memory Configuration				Compute Throughput		Fillrate		TDP (Watts)	MSRP (USD)
Model	Launch Date	Code Name	Transistors (million)	Die Size (mm^{2})	Bus Interface	Core (MHz)	Memory (MHz) (MT/s)	Core Config	Size (MB)	Bus Type	Bus Width (bit)	Bandwidth (GB/s)	Pixel Shader (MP/s)	Vertex Shader (MV/s) (Note: NVIDIA officially advertises 1/4 the maximum MV/s for Vertex Shader's performance compared to the theoretical maximum as it is more realistic for real world applications.)	Texel (MT/s)	Pixel (MP/s)	TDP (Watts)	MSRP (USD)
GeForce3 Ti200	October; 1, 2001	NV20	57	128	AGP; 4x	175	200 (400)	4:1:8:4	64; 128	DDR	128	6.40	700.0	175.0	1,400.0	700.0	?	$199
GeForce3	February; 27, 2001	NV20	57	128	AGP; 4x	200	230 (460)	4:1:8:4	64	DDR	128	7.36	800.0	200.0	1,600.0	800.0	?	$449
GeForce3 Ti500	October; 1, 2001	NV20	57	128	AGP; 4x	240	250 (500)	4:1:8:4	64	DDR	128	8.00	960.0	240.0	1,920.0	960.0	29	$349

=== GeForce4 series ===
- All models are built on the TSMC 150 nm process and support VPE 1.0, Accuview Antialiasing (AA), Lightspeed Memory Architecture II (LMA II), & nView.

Model	Launch Date	Code Name	Transistors (million)	Die Size (mm^{2})	Bus Interface	Clock Rate		Core Config	Memory Configuration				Compute Throughput		Fillrate		Supported APIs		TDP (Watts)	MSRP (USD)
Model	Launch Date	Code Name	Transistors (million)	Die Size (mm^{2})	Bus Interface	Core (MHz)	Memory (MHz) (MT/s)	Core Config	Size (MB)	Bus Type	Bus Width (bit)	Bandwidth (GB/s)	Pixel Shader (GP/s)	Vertex Shader (GV/s) (Note: NVIDIA officially advertises 1/4 the maximum GV/s for Vertex Shader's performance compared to the theoretical maximum as it is more realistic for real world applications.)	Texel (GT/s)	Pixel (GP/s)	Direct3D	OpenGL	TDP (Watts)	MSRP (USD)
GeForce4 MX IGP + nForce2	October; 1, 2002	NV1F	29	65	AGP; 4x	200	System shared up to 200 (400)	2:0:4:2	System shared up to 128	System shared DDR	System shared 64 or 128	System shared up to 6.40	0.400	—N/a	0.800	0.400	8.0	1.3	?	OEM
GeForce4 MX 420	February; 6, 2002	NV17	29	65	PCI	250	166 (166)	2:0:4:2	64	SDR	64	1.33	0.500	—N/a	1.000	0.500	7.0	1.5	14	$99
GeForce4 MX 420	February; 6, 2002	NV17	29	65	AGP; 4x	250	166 (166)	2:0:4:2	64	SDR	128	2.66	0.500	—N/a	1.000	0.500	7.0	1.5	14	$99
GeForce4 MX 420	February; 6, 2002	NV17	29	65	AGP; 4x	250	166 (332)	2:0:4:2	64	DDR	64	2.66	0.500	—N/a	1.000	0.500	7.0	1.5	14	$99
GeForce4 MX 440 SE	February; 6, 2002	NV18	29	65	AGP; 8x	250	200 (400)	2:0:4:2	64; 128	DDR	64	3.20	0.500	—N/a	1.000	0.500	7.0	1.5	13	$149
GeForce4 MX 440 SE	February; 6, 2002	NV17	29	65	AGP; 4x	250	166 (332)	2:0:4:2	64; 128	DDR	128	5.31	0.500	—N/a	1.000	0.500	7.0	1.5	13	$149
GeForce4 MX 440	February; 6, 2002	NV17	29	65	AGP; 4x	275	200 (400)	2:0:4:2	64	DDR	128	6.40	0.550	—N/a	1.100	0.550	7.0	1.5	18	$149
GeForce4 MX 440 Mac Edition	February; 6, 2002	NV17	29	65	AGP; 4x	275	200 (400)	2:0:4:2	64	DDR	128	6.40	0.550	—N/a	1.100	0.550	7.0	1.5	18	OEM
GeForce4 MX 440 8x	September; 26, 2002	NV18-A1	29	65	AGP; 8x	275	250 (500)	2:0:4:2	64; 128	DDR	128	8.00	0.550	—N/a	1.100	0.550	7.0	1.5	19	$149 $179
GeForce4 MX 440 8x	September; 26, 2002	NV18-A2	29	65	AGP; 8x	275	250 (500)	2:0:4:2	32	DDR	32	2.00	0.550	—N/a	1.100	0.550	7.0	1.5	19	$79
GeForce4 MX 440 8x	September; 26, 2002	NV18-A2	29	65	AGP; 8x	275	250 (500)	2:0:4:2	64	DDR	64	4.00	0.550	—N/a	1.100	0.550	7.0	1.5	19	$149
GeForce4 MX 440 8x	September; 26, 2002	NV18-A2	29	65	AGP; 8x	275	250 (500)	2:0:4:2	128	DDR	128	8.00	0.550	—N/a	1.100	0.550	7.0	1.5	19	$179
GeForce4 MX 460	February; 6, 2002	NV17	29	65	AGP; 4x	300	225 (450)	2:0:4:2	64; 128	DDR	128	7.20	0.600	—N/a	1.200	0.600	7.0	1.5	22	$179
GeForce4 MX 4000	December; 14, 2003	NV18C	29	65	PCI	250	166 (332)	2:0:4:2	128	DDR	64	2.66	0.500	—N/a	1.000	0.500	7.0	1.5	14	$99
GeForce4 MX 4000	December; 14, 2003	NV18	29	65	AGP; 8x	250	166 (332)	2:0:4:2	128	DDR	64	2.66	0.500	—N/a	1.000	0.500	7.0	1.5	14	$99
GeForce4 MX 4000 Rev. 2	December; 14, 2003	NV18C	29	65	AGP; 8x	250	166 (332)	2:0:4:2	128	DDR	64	2.66	0.500	—N/a	1.000	0.500	7.0	1.5	14	$99
GeForce4 Ti 4200	February; 6, 2002	NV25	63	142	AGP; 4x	250	250 (500)	4:2:8:4	64; 128	DDR	64	4.00	1.000	0.500	2.000	1.000	8.1	1.5	33	$199
GeForce4 Ti 4200	February; 6, 2002	NV25	63	142	AGP; 4x	250	250 (500)	4:2:8:4	64; 128	DDR	128	8.00	1.000	0.500	2.000	1.000	8.1	1.5	33	$199
GeForce4 Ti 4200 8x	February; 6, 2002	NV28	63	142	AGP; 8x	250	250 (250)	4:2:8:4	64; 128	SDR	128	4.00	1.000	0.500	2.000	1.000	8.1	1.5	34	$199
GeForce PCX 4300	February; 19, 2004	NV18C	29	65	PCIe; 1.0 x16	250	166 (332)	2:0:2:2	64	DDR	64	2.66	0.500	—N/a	0.500		7.0	1.5	18	$199
GeForce4 Ti 4400	February; 6, 2002	NV25	63	142	AGP; 4x	275	275 (550)	4:2:8:4	128	DDR	128	8.80	1.100	0.550	2.200	1.100	8.1	1.5	37	$299
GeForce4 Ti 4600	February; 6, 2002	NV25	63	142	AGP; 4x	300	324 (648)	4:2:8:4	128	DDR	128	10.37	1.200	0.600	2.400	1.200	8.1	1.5	?	$399
GeForce4 Ti 4800 SE (Note: This model is also known as the GeForce4 Ti 4400 8x.)	February; 16, 2003	NV28	63	142	AGP; 8x	275	275 (550)	4:2:8:4	128	DDR	128	8.80	1.100	0.550	2.200	1.100	8.1	1.5	38	$299
GeForce4 Ti 4800 (Note: This model is also known as the GeForce4 Ti 4600 8x.)	March; 15, 2003	NV28	63	142	AGP; 8x	300	325 (650)	4:2:8:4	128	DDR	128	10.40	1.200	0.600	2.400	1.200	8.1	1.5	43	$349
Model	Launch Date	Code Name	Transistors (million)	Die Size (mm^{2})	Bus Interface	Core (MHz)	Memory (MHz) (MT/s)	Core Config	Size (MB)	Bus Type	Bus Width (bit)	Bandwidth (GB/s)	Pixel Shader (GP/s)	Vertex Shader (GV/s)	Texel (GT/s)	Pixel (GP/s)	Direct3D	OpenGL	TDP (Watts)	MSRP (USD)
Model	Launch Date	Code Name	Transistors (million)	Die Size (mm^{2})	Bus Interface	Clock Rate		Core Config	Memory Configuration				Compute Throughput		Fillrate		Supported APIs		TDP (Watts)	MSRP (USD)

=== GeForce FX (5xxx) series ===
- All models support VPE 2.0, Direct3D 9.0a, & OpenGL 1.5 (Full) and 2.0 (Partial), but supports version 2.1 via software with latest drivers.

Model	Launch Date	Code Name	Fab (nm)	Transistors (million)	Die Size (mm^{2})	Bus Interface	Clock Rate		Core Config	Memory Configuration				Compute Throughput		Fillrate		TDP (Watts)	Power Connectors	MSRP (USD)
Model	Launch Date	Code Name	Fab (nm)	Transistors (million)	Die Size (mm^{2})	Bus Interface	Core (MHz)	Memory (MHz) (MT/s)	Core Config	Size (MB)	Bus Type	Bus Width (bit)	Bandwidth (GB/s)	Pixel Shader (GP/s)	Vertex Shader (GV/s) (Note: NVIDIA officially advertises 1/4 the maximum GV/s for Vertex Shader's performance compared to the theoretical maximum as it is more realistic for real world applications.)	Texel (GT/s)	Pixel (GP/s)	TDP (Watts)	Power Connectors	MSRP (USD)
GeForce FX 5100	March; 6, 2003	NV34	TSMC; 150 nm	45	124	AGP; 8x	200	166 (332)	4:2:4:4	64	DDR	64	2.66	0.800	0.400	0.800		?	None	OEM
GeForce FX 5200 LE	March; 17, 2003	NV34	TSMC; 150 nm	45	124	AGP; 8x	250	166 (332)	4:2:4:4	128	DDR	64	2.66	1.000	0.500	1.000	1.000	?	None	$69
GeForce FX 5200	March; 6, 2003	NV34B	TSMC; 150 nm	45	91	PCI	250	200 (400)	4:2:4:4	256	DDR	128	6.40	1.000	0.500	1.000	1.000	?	None	$69
GeForce FX 5200	March; 6, 2003	NV18C	TSMC; 150 nm	29	65	AGP; 8x	250	200 (400)	2:0:4:2	128	DDR	128	6.40	0.500	—N/a	1.000	0.500	?	None	$69
GeForce FX 5200	March; 6, 2003	NV34	TSMC; 150 nm	45	124	AGP; 8x	250	200 (400)	4:2:4:4	128	DDR	128	6.40	1.000	0.500	1.000	1.000	21	None	$99
GeForce FX 5200 Rev. 2	March; 6, 2003	NV34B	TSMC; 150 nm	45	91	AGP; 8x	250	200 (400)	4:2:4:4	128	DDR	64	3.20	1.000	0.500	1.000	1.000	?	None	$69
GeForce FX 5200 Ultra Mac Edition	March; 6, 2003	NV34	TSMC; 150 nm	45	124	AGP; Pro 8x	325	325 (650)	4:2:4:4	128	DDR	128	10.40	1.400	0.700	1.400		32	None	OEM
GeForce FX 5200 Ultra	March; 6, 2003	NV34	TSMC; 150 nm	45	124	AGP; 8x	325	325 (650)	4:2:4:4	128	DDR	128	10.40	1.400	0.700	1.400		32	1x Molex	$149
GeForce PCX 5300	February; 17, 2004	NV37	TSMC; 150 nm	45	91	PCIe; 1.0 x16	250	200 (400)	4:2:4:4	128	DDR	128	6.40	1.000	0.500	1.000		21	None	OEM
GeForce FX 5500	March; 17, 2004	NV34B	TSMC; 150 nm	45	91	PCI	270	200 (400)	4:2:4:4	256	DDR	128	6.40	1.080	0.540	1.080		?	None	$99
GeForce FX 5500	March; 17, 2004	NV34B	TSMC; 150 nm	45	91	AGP; 8x	270	166 (332)	4:2:4:4	64; 128; 256	DDR	128	5.31	1.080	0.540	1.080		?	None	$37 $49 $79
GeForce FX 5600 XT	March; 17, 2003	NV31	TSMC; 130 nm	80	121	PCI	235	200 (400)	4:2:4:4	64	DDR	128	6.40	0.940	0.470	0.940		?	None	$179
GeForce FX 5600 XT	March; 17, 2003	NV31	TSMC; 130 nm	80	121	AGP; 8x	235	200 (400)	4:2:4:4	128	DDR	128	6.40	0.940	0.470	0.940		?	None	$199
GeForce FX 5600	March; 6, 2003	NV31	TSMC; 130 nm	80	121	AGP; 8x	325	250 (500)	4:2:4:4	128	DDR	128	8.00	1.300	0.650	1.300		37	None	$179
GeForce FX 5600 Ultra	March; 17, 2003	NV31	TSMC; 130 nm	80	121	AGP; 8x	400	400 (800)	4:2:4:4	128	DDR	128	12.80	1.600	0.800	1.600		27	1x Molex	$199
GeForce FX 5700 VE	September; 1, 2004	NV36	IBM; 130 nm	82	133	AGP; 8x	250	200 (400)	4:3:4:4	128	DDR	128	6.40	1.000	0.750	1.000		20	None	$149
GeForce FX 5700 LE	March; 1, 2004	NV36	IBM; 130 nm	82	133	PCI	250	200 (400)	4:3:4:4	128	DDR	64	3.20	1.000	0.750	1.000		21	None	$149
GeForce FX 5700 LE	March; 1, 2004	NV36	IBM; 130 nm	82	133	AGP; 8x	250	200 (400)	4:3:4:4	128; 256	DDR	64	3.20	1.000	0.750	1.000		21	None	$149
GeForce FX 5700 EP	September; 1, 2004	NV36	IBM; 130 nm	82	133	AGP; 8x	425	200 (400)	4:3:4:4	128	DDR	64	3.20	1.700	1.275	1.700		?	None	OEM
GeForce FX 5700 E.S.	August; 18, 2003	NV36S	IBM; 130 nm	82	133	AGP; 8x	425	250 (500)	4:3:4:4	128	DDR	128	8.00	1.700	1.275	1.700		25	1x Molex	—N/a
GeForce FX 5700	October; 23, 2003	NV36B	IBM; 130 nm	82	133	AGP; 8x	425	250 (500)	4:3:4:4	128; 256	DDR	128	8.00	1.700	1.275	1.700		25	None	$149
GeForce FX 5700 Ultra	October; 23, 2003	NV36B	IBM; 130 nm	82	133	AGP; 8x	475	453 (906)	4:3:4:4	128	GDDR2	128	14.50	1.900	1.425	1.900		46	1x Molex	$199
GeForce PCX 5750	February; 17, 2004	NV39	TSMC; 130 nm	82	125	PCIe; 1.0 x16	425	275 (550)	4:3:4:4	128	DDR	128	8.80	1.700	1.275	1.700		50	None	$199
GeForce FX 5800	March; 6, 2003	NV30	TSMC; 130 nm	125	199	AGP; 8x	400	400 (800)	4:3:8:4	128	GDDR2	128	12.80	1.600	1.200	3.200	1.600	44	1x Molex	$299
GeForce FX 5800 Ultra	March; 6, 2003	NV30	TSMC; 130 nm	125	199	AGP; 8x	500	500 (1000)	4:3:8:4	128	GDDR2	128	16.00	2.000	1.500	4.000	2.000	66	1x Molex	$399
GeForce FX 5900 ZT	May; 12, 2003	NV35	TSMC; 130 nm	135	207	AGP; 8x	325	350 (700)	4:3:8:4	128	DDR	256	22.40	1.300	0.975	2.600	1.300	?	1x Molex	OEM
GeForce FX 5900 XT	May; 12, 2003	NV35	TSMC; 130 nm	135	207	AGP; 8x	400	350 (700)	4:3:8:4	128	DDR	256	22.40	1.600	1.200	3.200	1.600	35	1x Molex	$179
GeForce FX 5900	May; 12, 2003	NV35	TSMC; 130 nm	135	207	AGP; 8x	400	425 (850)	4:3:8:4	128	DDR	256	27.20	1.600	1.200	3.200	1.600	55	1x Molex	$399
GeForce PCX 5900	March; 17, 2003	NV35	TSMC; 130 nm	135	207	PCIe; 1.0 x16	350	275 (550)	4:3:8:4	128; 256	DDR	256	17.60	1.400	1.050	2.800	1.400	49	None	$399
GeForce FX 5900 Ultra	October; 23, 2003	NV35	TSMC; 130 nm	135	207	AGP; 8x	450	425 (550)	4:3:8:4	256	DDR	256	27.20	1.800	1.350	3.600	1.800	59	1x Molex	$499
GeForce FX 5950 Ultra	October; 23, 2003	NV38	TSMC; 130 nm	135	207	AGP; 8x	475	475 (950)	4:3:8:4	256	DDR	256	37.40	1.900	1.425	3.800	1.900	74	1x Molex	$499
Model	Launch Date	Code Name	Fab (nm)	Transistors (million)	Die Size (mm^{2})	Bus Interface	Core (MHz)	Memory (MHz) (MT/s)	Core Config	Size (MB)	Bus Type	Bus Width (bit)	Bandwidth (GB/s)	Pixel Shader (GP/s)	Vertex Shader (GV/s)	Texel (GT/s)	Pixel (GP/s)	TDP (Watts)	Power Connectors	MSRP (USD)
Model	Launch Date	Code Name	Fab (nm)	Transistors (million)	Die Size (mm^{2})	Bus Interface	Clock Rate		Core Config	Memory Configuration				Compute Throughput		Fillrate		TDP (Watts)	Power Connectors	MSRP (USD)

=== GeForce 6 (6xxx) series ===
- All models support Direct3D 9.0c (9_3) & PureVideo 1 with VP1 Engine, except the 6200 AGP (NV18C Core), which supports Direct3D 7.0 and lacks PureVideo and VP1 Support.
- All models support Transparency AA (starting with version 91.47 of the ForceWare drivers).

Model	Launch Date	Code Name	Fab (nm)	Transistors (million)	Die Size (mm^{2})	Bus Interface	Clock Rate		Core Config	Memory Configuration				Compute Throughput		Fillrate		Features					TDP (Watts)	Power Connectors	MSRP (USD)
Model	Launch Date	Code Name	Fab (nm)	Transistors (million)	Die Size (mm^{2})	Bus Interface	Core (MHz)	Memory (MHz) (MT/s)	Core Config	Size (MB)	Bus Type	Bus Width (bit)	Bandwidth (GB/s)	Pixel Shader (GP/s)	Vertex Shader (GV/s) (Note: NVIDIA officially advertises 1/4 the maximum GV/s for Vertex Shader's performance compared to the theoretical maximum as it is more realistic for real world applications.)	Texel (GT/s)	Pixel (GP/s)	OpenEXR HDR	SLI	TurboCache	PureVideo WMV9	OpenGL	TDP (Watts)	Power Connectors	MSRP (USD)
GeForce 6100	October; 11, 2004	C51	TSMC; 90 nm	?		PCI (HyperTransport)	425	System shared up to 200 (400) or 533 (1066)	2:1:1:1	System shared up to 256	System shared DDR or DDR2	System shared 64 or 128	System shared up to 6.40 or 17.06	0.850	0.425			No	No	No	Yes (Limited) (Note: Lacks support for 1080p video decoding as well as support for certain video formats. Only supports up to 720p/1080i.)	2.0 (Full); 2.1 (Partial)	?	None	OEM
GeForce 6100 + nForce 400	October; 11, 2004	C61	TSMC; 90 nm	?		PCI (HyperTransport)	425	System shared up to 200 (400) or 533 (1066)	2:1:1:1	System shared up to 256	System shared DDR or DDR2	System shared 64 or 128	System shared up to 6.40 or 17.06	0.850	0.425			No	No	No	Yes (Limited)	2.0 (Full); 2.1 (Partial)	?	None	OEM
GeForce 6100 + nForce 405	October; 11, 2004	C61	TSMC; 90 nm	?		PCI (HyperTransport)	425	System shared up to 200 (400) or 533 (1066)	2:1:1:1	System shared up to 256	System shared DDR or DDR2	System shared 64 or 128	System shared up to 6.40 or 17.06	0.850	0.425			No	No	No	Yes (Limited)	2.0 (Full); 2.1 (Partial)	?	None	OEM
GeForce 6100 + nForce 410	October; 11, 2004	C51	TSMC; 90 nm	?		PCI (HyperTransport)	425	System shared up to 200 (400) or 533 (1066)	2:1:1:1	System shared up to 256	System shared DDR or DDR2	System shared 64 or 128	System shared up to 6.40 or 17.06	0.850	0.425			No	No	No	Yes (Limited)	2.0 (Full); 2.1 (Partial)	?	None	OEM
GeForce 6100 + nForce 420	October; 11, 2004	C61	TSMC; 90 nm	?		PCI (HyperTransport)	425	System shared up to 200 (400) or 533 (1066)	2:1:1:1	System shared up to 256	System shared DDR or DDR2	System shared 64 or 128	System shared up to 6.40 or 17.06	0.850	0.425			No	No	No	Yes (Limited)	2.0 (Full); 2.1 (Partial)	?	None	OEM
GeForce 6100 + nForce 430	October; 11, 2004	C61	TSMC; 90 nm	?		PCI (HyperTransport)	425	System shared up to 200 (400) or 533 (1066)	2:1:1:1	System shared up to 256	System shared DDR or DDR2	System shared 64 or 128	System shared up to 6.40 or 17.06	0.850	0.425			No	No	No	Yes (Limited)	2.0 (Full); 2.1 (Partial)	?	None	OEM
GeForce 6150 SE + nForce 430	October; 11, 2004	C61	TSMC; 90 nm	?		PCI (HyperTransport)	425	System shared up to 200 (400) or 533 (1066)	2:1:1:1	System shared up to 256	System shared DDR or DDR2	System shared 64 or 128	System shared up to 6.40 or 17.06	0.850	0.425			No	No	Yes (Driver- based only)	Yes (Limited)	2.0 (Full); 2.1 (Partial)	?	None	OEM
GeForce 6150 LE + nForce 430	October; 11, 2004	C51	TSMC; 90 nm	?		PCI (HyperTransport)	425	System shared up to 200 (400) or 533 (1066)	2:1:1:1	System shared up to 256	System shared DDR or DDR2	System shared 64 or 128	System shared up to 6.40 or 17.06	0.850	0.425			No	No	Yes (Driver- based only)	Yes	2.0 (Full); 2.1 (Partial)	?	None	OEM
GeForce 6150 + nForce 430	October; 11, 2004	C51	TSMC; 90 nm	?		PCI (HyperTransport)	475	System shared up to 200 (400) or 533 (1066)	2:1:1:1	System shared up to 256	System shared DDR or DDR2	System shared 64 or 128	System shared up to 6.40 or 17.06	0.950	0.475			No	No	No	Yes	2.0 (Full); 2.1 (Partial)	?	None	OEM
GeForce 6200 SE TurboCache	December; 15, 2004	NV44	TSMC; 110 nm	75	110	PCIe; 1.0 x16	350	250 (500)	4:3:4:2	64	DDR	32	2.00	1.400	1.050	1.400	0.700	No	No	Yes	Yes	2.0 (Full); 2.1 (Partial)	?	None	OEM
GeForce 6200 LE	October; 11, 2004	NV43	TSMC; 110 nm	146	154	PCI	300	266 (532)	4:3:4:2	256	DDR	64	4.26	1.200	0.900	1.200	0.600	No	No	No	Yes	2.0 (Full); 2.1 (Partial)	?	None	$149
GeForce 6200 LE	April; 4, 2005	NV44	TSMC; 110 nm	75	110	AGP; 8x	350	266 (532)	2:1:2:2	128	DDR	64	4.26	0.700	0.350	0.700		No	No	No	Yes	2.0 (Full); 2.1 (Partial)	?	None	OEM
GeForce 6200 LE 512	October; 11, 2004	NV44	TSMC; 110 nm	75	110	AGP; 8x	300	275 (550)	4:3:4:2	512	DDR2	128	8.80	1.200	0.900	1.200	0.600	No	No	No	Yes	2.0 (Full); 2.1 (Partial)	?	None	$79
GeForce 6200 LE	April; 4, 2005	NV44	TSMC; 110 nm	75	110	PCIe; 1.0 x16	350	266 (532)	2:1:2:2	64	DDR2	32	2.13	0.700	0.350	0.700		No	No	Yes	Yes	2.0 (Full); 2.1 (Partial)	?	None	OEM
GeForce 6200 LE	April; 4, 2005	NV44	TSMC; 110 nm	75	110	PCIe; 1.0 x16	350	266 (532)	2:1:2:2	128	DDR	64	4.26	0.700	0.350	0.700		No	No	Yes	Yes	2.0 (Full); 2.1 (Partial)	?	None	$129
GeForce 6200 PCI	January; 16, 2008	NV44	TSMC; 110 nm	75	110	PCI	280	200 (400)	4:3:4:2	256; 512	DDR2	64	3.20	1.120	0.840	1.120	0.560	No	No	No	Yes	2.0 (Full); 2.1 (Partial)	20	None	$129
GeForce 6200 TurboCache	December; 15, 2004	NV44B	TSMC; 110 nm	75	110	AGP; 4x	350	250 (500)	4:3:4:2	64	DDR	64	4.00	1.400	1.050	1.400	0.700	No	No	No	Yes	2.0 (Full); 2.1 (Partial)	25	None	$129
GeForce 6200 AGP	December; 14, 2003	NV18C	TSMC; 150 nm	29	65	AGP; 8x	230	66 (133)	2:0:4:2	128	DDR	64	1.06	0.460	—N/a	0.920	0.460	No	No	No	No	1.5	?	None	?
GeForce 6200 AGP	April; 4, 2005	NV44A	TSMC; 110 nm	75	110	AGP; 8x	350	250 (500)	4:2:4:4	128; 256	DDR	64	4.00	1.400	0.700	1.400		No	No	No	Yes	2.0 (Full); 2.1 (Partial)	?	None	$169
GeForce 6200 AGP	April; 4, 2005	NV44A	TSMC; 110 nm	75	110	AGP; 8x	350	266 (532)	4:3:4:2	256	DDR2	64	4.26	1.400	1.050	1.400	0.700	No	No	No	Yes	2.0 (Full); 2.1 (Partial)	?	None	$129
GeForce 6200	October; 11, 2004	NV43	TSMC; 110 nm	146	154	PCIe; 1.0 x16	300	275 (550)	4:3:4:2	128	DDR	128	8.80	1.200	0.900	1.200	0.600	No	No	Yes	Yes	2.0 (Full); 2.1 (Partial)	?	None	$129
GeForce 6200 X2	January; 16, 2008	2x NV44	TSMC; 110 nm	2x 75	2x 110	PCI	280	200 (400)	2x 4:3:4:2	2x 256; 2x 512	DDR2	2x 64	2x 3.20	2x 1.120	2x 0.840	2x 1.120	2x 0.560	No	No	No	Yes	2.0 (Full); 2.1 (Partial)	?	1x 6-Pin	$89
GeForce 6500	October; 1, 2005	NV44	TSMC; 110 nm	75	110	PCIe; 1.0 x16	400	266 (532)	4:3:4:2	128	DDR2	128	8.51	1.600	1.200	1.600	0.800	No	Yes	Yes	Yes	2.0 (Full); 2.1 (Partial)	?	None	$99
GeForce 6600 VE	2005	NV43	TSMC; 110 nm	146	154	PCIe; 1.0 x16	300	200 (400)	4:2:4:4	128	GDDR3	128	6.40	1.200	0.600	1.200	1.200	Yes	Yes	No	Yes	2.0 (Full); 2.1 (Partial)	?	None	$99
GeForce 6600 LE	2005	NV43	TSMC; 110 nm	146	154	AGP; 8x	300	200 (400)	4:3:4:2	128	DDR	128	6.40	1.200	0.900	1.200	0.600	Yes	No	No	Yes	2.0 (Full); 2.1 (Partial)	?	None	$149
GeForce 6600 LE	2005	NV43	TSMC; 110 nm	146	154	PCIe; 1.0 x16	300	250 (500)	4:3:4:2	128	DDR	128	8.00	1.200	0.900	1.200	0.600	Yes	Yes	No	Yes	2.0 (Full); 2.1 (Partial)	?	None	$149
GeForce 6600	August; 12, 2004	NV43	TSMC; 110 nm	146	154	AGP; 8x	300	250 (500)	8:3:8:4	128; 256	DDR	128	8.00	2.400	0.900	2.400	1.200	Yes	No	No	Yes	2.0 (Full); 2.1 (Partial)	26	None	$149
GeForce 6600	August; 12, 2004	NV43	TSMC; 110 nm	146	154	PCIe; 1.0 x16	300	250 (500)	8:3:8:4	256; 512	DDR	128	8.00	2.400	0.900	2.400	1.200	Yes	Yes	No	Yes	2.0 (Full); 2.1 (Partial)	?	None	$149
GeForce 6600 GT	November; 14, 2004	NV43	TSMC; 110 nm	146	154	AGP; 8x	500	475 (950)	8:3:8:4	128	GDDR3	128	15.20	4.000	1.500	4.000	2.000	Yes	No	No	Yes	2.0 (Full); 2.1 (Partial)	47	1x Molex	$199
GeForce 6600 GT	August; 12, 2004	NV43	TSMC; 110 nm	146	154	PCIe; 1.0 x16	500	500 (1000)	8:3:8:4	128; 256	GDDR3	128	16.00	4.000	1.500	4.000	2.000	Yes	Yes	No	Yes	2.0 (Full); 2.1 (Partial)	?	None	$199
GeForce 6600 GT Dual	August; 12, 2004	2x NV43	TSMC; 110 nm	146	154	PCIe; 1.0 x16	500	560 (1120)	2x 8:3:8:4	2x 128	GDDR3	2x 128	2x 17.92	2x 4.000	2x 1.500	2x 4.000	2x 2.000	Yes	No	No	Yes	2.0 (Full); 2.1 (Partial)	?	1x 6-Pin	$599
GeForce 6610 XL	November; 14, 2004	NV43	TSMC; 110 nm	146	154	PCIe; 1.0 x16	400	400 (800)	8:3:8:4	128	GDDR3	128	12.80	3.200	1.200	3.200	1.600	Yes	No	No	Yes	2.0 (Full); 2.1 (Partial)	?	None	OEM
GeForce 6700 XL	November; 14, 2004	NV43	TSMC; 110 nm	146	154	PCIe; 1.0 x16	525	550 (1100)	8:3:8:4	128	GDDR3	128	17.60	4.200	1.580	4.200	2.100	Yes	No	No	Yes	2.0 (Full); 2.1 (Partial)	50	1x 6-Pin	OEM
GeForce 6800 XE	September; 30, 2005	NV40	TSMC; 130 nm	222	287	AGP; 8x	275	266 (532)	8:3:8:8	256	DDR2	128	8.51	2.200	0.825	2.200	2.000	Yes	No	No	No	2.0.3 (Full); 2.1 (Partial)	?	None	$199
GeForce 6800 LE AGP	July; 21, 2004	NV40	TSMC; 130 nm	222	287	AGP; 8x	300	350 (700)	8:4:8:8	128	DDR	256	22.40	2.400	1.200	2.400		Yes	No	No	No	2.0.3 (Full); 2.1 (Partial)	?	1x Molex	$249
GeForce 6800 LE AGP	January; 16, 2005	NV41	TSMC; 130 nm	190	225	PCIe; 1.0 x16	325	300 (600)	8:4:8:8	256	DDR	256	19.20	2.600	1.300	2.600		Yes	Yes	No	No	2.0 (Full); 2.1 (Partial)	?	None	$249
GeForce 6800 XT	September; 30, 2005	NV48	TSMC; 110 nm	222	287	AGP; 8x	300	266 (532)	8:4:8:8	256	DDR	128	8.51	2.400	1.200	2.400		Yes	No	No	No	2.0 (Full); 2.1 (Partial)	36	1x Molex	$219
GeForce 6800 XT	September; 30, 2005	NV40	TSMC; 130 nm	222	287	AGP; 8x	300	350 (700)	8:4:8:8	256	DDR	256	22.40	2.400	1.200	2.400		Yes	No	No	No	2.0.3 (Full); 2.1 (Partial)	36	1x Molex	$199
GeForce 6800 XT	September; 30, 2005	NV42	TSMC; 110 nm	202	222	AGP; 8x	450	600 (1200)	12:5:12:8	256	GDDR3	256	38.40	5.400	2.250	5.400	3.600	Yes	No	No	Yes	2.0 (Full); 2.1 (Partial)	36	1x Molex	$219
GeForce 6800 XT	September; 30, 2005	NV41	TSMC; 130 nm	190	225	PCIe; 1.0 x16	425	500 (1000)	8:4:8:8	256	GDDR3	256	32.00	3.400	1.700	3.400		Yes	Yes	No	No	2.0 (Full); 2.1 (Partial)	?	1x 6-Pin	$249
GeForce 6800	April; 14, 2004	NV48	TSMC; 110 nm	222	287	AGP; 8x	325	350 (700)	12:5:12:12	256	DDR	256	22.40	3.900	1.625	3.900	3.900	Yes	No	No	No	2.0 (Full); 2.1 (Partial)	40	1x Molex	OEM
GeForce 6800	April; 14, 2004	NV40	TSMC; 130 nm	222	287	AGP; 8x	325	350 (700)	12:5:12:12	128	DDR	256	22.40	3.900	1.625	3.900	3.900	Yes	No	No	No	2.0.3 (Full); 2.1 (Partial)	40	1x Molex	$299
GeForce 6800	November; 8, 2004	NV41	TSMC; 130 nm	190	225	PCIe; 1.0 x16	325	300 (600)	12:5:12:8	256	DDR	256	19.20	3.900	1.625	3.900	2.600	Yes	Yes	No	Yes	2.0 (Full); 2.1 (Partial)	?	None	$299
GeForce 6800 GTO	April; 14, 2004	NV45	TSMC; 130 nm	222	287	PCIe; 1.0 x16	350	500 (1000)	12:5:12:12	256	GDDR3	256	32.00	4.200	1.750	4.200		Yes	Yes	No	No	2.0 (Full); 2.1 (Partial)	?	1x 6-Pin	OEM
GeForce 6800 GS	December; 8, 2005	NV40	TSMC; 130 nm	222	287	AGP; 8x	350	500 (1000)	12:5:12:12	256	GDDR3	256	32.00	4.200	1.750	4.200		Yes	No	No	No	2.0.3 (Full); 2.1 (Partial)	59	1x Molex	$249
GeForce 6800 GS	November; 7, 2005	NV41	TSMC; 130 nm	190	225	PCIe; 1.0 x16	425	500 (1000)	12:5:12:8	256; 512	GDDR3	256	32.00	5.100	2.125	5.100	3.400	Yes	Yes	No	No	2.0 (Full); 2.1 (Partial)	?	1x 6-Pin	$249
GeForce 6800 GT AGP	April; 14, 2004	NV40	TSMC; 130 nm	222	287	AGP; 8x	350	250 (500)	16:6:16:16	128	DDR	256	16.00	5.600	2.100	5.600		Yes	No	No	No	2.0.3 (Full); 2.1 (Partial)	67	1x Molex	$399
GeForce 6800 GT AGP	April; 14, 2004	NV48	TSMC; 110 nm	222	287	AGP; 8x	350	500 (1000)	16:6:16:16	256	GDDR3	256	32.00	5.600	2.100	5.600		Yes	No	No	No	2.0 (Full); 2.1 (Partial)	67	1x Molex	$499
GeForce 6800 GT DDL	April; 14, 2004	NV40	TSMC; 130 nm	222	287	AGP; Pro 8x	350	500 (1000)	16:6:16:16	256	GDDR3	256	32.00	5.600	2.100	5.600		Yes	No	No	No	2.0.3 (Full); 2.1 (Partial)	80	None	OEM
GeForce 6800 GT	June; 8, 2004	NV45	TSMC; 130 nm	222	287	PCIe; 1.0 x16	350	500 (1000)	16:6:16:16	256	GDDR3	256	32.00	5.600	2.100	5.600		Yes	Yes	No	No	2.0 (Full); 2.1 (Partial)	67	1x 6-Pin	$399
GeForce 6800 GT Dual	June; 8, 2004	2x NV45	TSMC; 130 nm	2x 222	2x 287	PCIe; 1.0 x16	350	500 (1000)	2x 16:6:16:16	2x 256	GDDR3	2x 256	2x 32.00	2x 5.600	2x 2.100	2x 5.600		Yes	No	No	No	2.0 (Full); 2.1 (Partial)	?	1x 6-Pin	$499
GeForce 6800 Ultra AGP	April; 14, 2004	NV40	TSMC; 130 nm	222	287	AGP; 8x	425	550 (1100)	16:6:16:16	256	GDDR3	256	35.20	6.800	2.550	6.800		Yes	No	No	No	2.0.3 (Full); 2.1 (Partial)	?	2x Molex	$499
GeForce 6800 Ultra DDL	April; 14, 2004	NV40	TSMC; 130 nm	222	287	AGP; Pro 8x	400	550 (1100)	16:6:16:16	256	GDDR3	256	35.20	6.400	2.400	6.400		Yes	No	No	No	2.0.3 (Full); 2.1 (Partial)	100	None	OEM
GeForce 6800 Ultra	July; 26, 2004	NV45	TSMC; 130 nm	222	287	PCIe; 1.0 x16	425	550 (1100)	16:6:16:16	256	GDDR3	256	35.20	6.800	2.550	6.800		Yes	Yes	No	No	2.0 (Full); 2.1 (Partial)	81	1x 6-Pin	$499
Model	Launch Date	Code Name	Fab (nm)	Transistors (million)	Die Size (mm^{2})	Bus Interface	Core (MHz)	Memory (MHz) (MT/s)	Core Config	Size (MB)	Bus Type	Bus Width (bit)	Bandwidth (GB/s)	Pixel Shader (GP/s)	Vertex Shader (GV/s)	Texel (GT/s)	Pixel (GP/s)	OpenEXR HDR	SLI	TurboCache	PureVideo WMV9	OpenGL	TDP (Watts)	Power Connectors	MSRP (USD)
Model	Launch Date	Code Name	Fab (nm)	Transistors (million)	Die Size (mm^{2})	Bus Interface	Clock Rate		Core Config	Memory Configuration				Compute Throughput		Fillrate		Features					TDP (Watts)	Power Connectors	MSRP (USD)

=== GeForce 7 (7xxx) series ===
- All models support Direct3D 9.0c (9_3), PureVideo 1 with VP1 Engine, & Transparency AA (starting with version 91.47 of the ForceWare drivers)
- All models using a GXX based core support gamma-correct antialiasing & 64-bit OpenEXR HDR.
- Models 7050 + nForce 610i through the 7300 GS support TurboCache.

Model	Launch Date	Code Name	Fab (nm)	Transistors (million)	Die Size (mm^{2})	Bus Interface	Clock Rate		Core Config	Memory Configuration				Compute Throughput		Fillrate		Features		TDP (Watts)	Power Connectors	MSRP (USD)
Model	Launch Date	Code Name	Fab (nm)	Transistors (million)	Die Size (mm^{2})	Bus Interface	Core (Boost) (MHz)	Memory (MHz) (MT/s)	Core Config	Size (MB)	Bus Type	Bus Width (bit)	Bandwidth (GB/s)	Pixel Shader (GP/s)	Vertex Shader (GV/s) (Note: NVIDIA officially advertises 1/4 the maximum GV/s for Vertex Shader's performance compared to the theoretical maximum as it is more realistic for real world applications.)	Texel (GT/s)	Pixel (GP/s)	SLI	OpenGL	TDP (Watts)	Power Connectors	MSRP (USD)
GeForce 7025 + nForce 630a	February; 1, 2006	C67	TSMC; 90 nm	112	81	PCI (HyperTransport)	425	System shared up to 400 (800)	2:1:1:1	System shared up to 512	System shared DDR2	System shared 64 or 128	System shared up to 12.80	0.850	0.425			No	2.0 (Full); 2.1 (Partial)	?	None	OEM (Note: Some non-OEM motherboards were available with these chipsets, but they were uncommon.)
GeForce 7025 + nForce 630a	February; 1, 2006	C68	TSMC; 90 nm	112	81	PCI (HyperTransport)	425	System shared up to 400 (800)	2:1:1:1	System shared up to 512	System shared DDR2	System shared 64 or 128	System shared up to 12.80	0.850	0.425			No	2.0 (Full); 2.1 (Partial)	?	None	OEM
GeForce 7050 SE + nForce 630a	February; 1, 2006	C68	TSMC; 90 nm	112	81	PCI (HyperTransport)	425	System shared up to 400 (800)	2:1:2:1	System shared up to 512	System shared DDR2	System shared 64 or 128	System shared up to 12.80	0.850	0.425	0.850	0.425	No	2.0 (Full); 2.1 (Partial)	?	None	OEM
GeForce 7050 PV + nForce 630a (Note: The 7050 PV was nearly identical to the 7050 SE, the only major differences being the 7050 PV model supported HDCP for Blu-ray playback, as well as came with HDMI outputs.)	February; 1, 2006	C68	TSMC; 90 nm	112	81	PCI (HyperTransport)	425	System shared up to 400 (800)	2:1:2:1	System shared up to 512	System shared DDR2	System shared 64 or 128	System shared up to 12.80	0.850	0.425	0.850	0.425	No	2.0 (Full); 2.1 (Partial)	?	None	OEM
GeForce 7050 + nForce 610i	January; 13, 2008	C73B	TSMC; 90 nm	112	81	PCI (HyperTransport)	500	System shared up to 400 (800)	2:1:2:2	System shared up to 512	System shared DDR2	System shared 64 or 128	System shared up to 12.80	1.000	0.500	1.000		No	2.0 (Full); 2.1 (Partial)	?	None	OEM
GeForce 7050 + nForce 620i	October; 4, 2007	C73	TSMC; 90 nm	112	81	PCI (HyperTransport)	500 (630)	System shared up to 400 (800)	2:1:2:2	System shared up to 512	System shared DDR2	System shared 64 or 128	System shared up to 12.80	1.000 (1.260)	0.500 (0.630)	1.000 (1.260)		No	2.0 (Full); 2.1 (Partial)	?	None	OEM
GeForce 7050 + nForce 630i (Note: The 7050 + 620i was nearly identical to the 7050 + 630i, the only major differences being the 7050 + 630i model supported higher FSB speeds of 1333MHz vs the typical 1066MHz, as well as supported newer Core 2 Quad CPUs.)	October; 4, 2007	C73	TSMC; 90 nm	112	81	PCI (HyperTransport)	500 (630)	System shared up to 400 (800)	2:1:2:2	System shared up to 512	System shared DDR2	System shared 64 or 128	System shared up to 12.80	1.000 (1.260)	0.500 (0.630)	1.000 (1.260)		No	2.0 (Full); 2.1 (Partial)	?	None	OEM
GeForce 7100 + nForce 630i	October; 4, 2007	C73	TSMC; 90 nm	112	81	PCI (HyperTransport)	600	System shared up to 400 (800)	4:1:2:2	System shared up to 512	System shared DDR2	System shared 64 or 128	System shared up to 12.80	2.400	0.600	1.200		No	2.0 (Full); 2.1 (Partial)	?	None	OEM
GeForce 7150 + nForce 630i	November; 16, 2007	C73	TSMC; 90 nm	112	81	PCI (HyperTransport)	630	System shared up to 400 (800)	2:1:2:2	System shared up to 512	System shared DDR2	System shared 64 or 128	System shared up to 12.80	1.260	0.630	1.260		No	2.0 (Full); 2.1 (Partial)	?	None	OEM
GeForce 7100 GS	August; 8, 2006	NV44B	TSMC; 110 nm	75	110	PCIe; 1.0 x16	350	266 (532)	4:3:4:2	128; 256	DDR2	64	4.26	1.400	1.050	1.400	0.700	Yes (Note: The GPUs: 7100 GS, 7300 GS, 7300 GT, 7500 LE, & 7600 LE can only function in SLI mode through the PCIe slot (bridgeless). All other GPUs that support SLI can use this feature too.)	2.0 (Full); 2.1 (Partial)	?	None	OEM
GeForce 7200 GS	January; 18, 2006	G72	TSMC; 90 nm	112	81	PCIe; 1.0 x16	450	334 (668)	2:2:4:2	128	DDR2	64	5.34	0.900		1.800	0.900	No	2.1	?	None	OEM
GeForce 7300 SE	March; 22, 2006	G72	TSMC; 90 nm	112	81	PCIe; 1.0 x16	450	266 (532)	4:3:4:2	256	DDR2	64	4.26	1.800	1.350	1.800	0.900	No	2.1	?	None	OEM
GeForce 7300 LE	March; 22, 2006	G72	TSMC; 90 nm	112	81	PCIe; 1.0 x16	450	324 (648)	4:3:4:2	128	DDR2	64	5.18	1.800	1.350	1.800	0.900	No	2.1	?	None	OEM
GeForce 7350 LE	March; 22, 2006	G72	TSMC; 90 nm	112	81	PCIe; 1.0 x16	450	400 (800)	4:3:4:2	128; 256	DDR2	64	6.40	1.800	1.350	1.800	0.900	No	2.1	?	None	OEM
GeForce 7300 GS	January; 18, 2006	G72	TSMC; 90 nm	112	81	PCIe; 1.0 x16	450	266 (532)	4:3:4:2	256	DDR2	64	4.26	1.800	1.350	1.800	0.900	Yes	2.1	23	None	$99
GeForce 7300 GT AGP	May; 15, 2006	G73B	TSMC; 80 nm	177	100	AGP; 8x	350	325 (650)	8:4:8:8	128; 256	DDR2	128	10.40	2.800	1.400	2.800		No	2.1	24	None	$99
GeForce 7300 GT AGP	May; 15, 2006	G73B	TSMC; 80 nm	177	100	AGP; 8x	350	325 (650)	8:4:8:8	512	GDDR3	128	10.40	2.800	1.400	2.800		No	2.1	24	None	$99
GeForce 7300 GT	May; 15, 2006	G73	TSMC; 90 nm	177	125	PCIe; 1.0 x16	350	325 (650)	8:4:8:8	128; 256	DDR2	128	10.40	2.800	1.400	2.800		Yes	2.1	24	None	$99
GeForce 7300 GT	May; 15, 2006	G73B	TSMC; 80 nm	177	100	PCIe; 1.0 x16	350	325 (650)	8:4:8:8	128; 256	DDR2	128	10.40	2.800	1.400	2.800		Yes	2.1	24	None	$99
GeForce 7300 GT Mac Edition	August; 26, 2006	G73	TSMC; 90 nm	177	125	PCIe; 1.0 x16	350	500 (1000)	8:4:8:8	128	GDDR3	128	16.00	2.800	1.400	2.800		No	2.1	24	None	OEM
GeForce 7500 LE	March; 22, 2006	G72	TSMC; 90 nm	112	81	PCIe; 1.0 x16	475	405 (810)	8:5:8:4	64; 128; 256	DDR2	64	6.48	3.800	2.375	3.800	1.900	Yes	2.1	?	None	OEM
GeForce 7600 LE	March; 22, 2006	G73B	TSMC; 80 nm	177	100	PCIe; 1.0 x16	400	400 (800)	8:4:8:8	256	DDR2	128	12.80	3.200	1.600	3.200		Yes	2.1	?	None	$129
GeForce 7600 GS AGP	July; 1, 2006	G73B	TSMC; 80 nm	177	100	AGP; 8x	400	400 (800)	12:5:12:8	256; 512	DDR2	128	12.80	4.800	2.000	4.800	3.200	No	2.1	27	1x Molex	$149
GeForce 7600 GS AGP	July; 1, 2006	G71	TSMC; 90 nm	278	196	AGP; 8x	500	725 (1450)	12:5:12:8	256	GDDR3	128	23.20	6.000	2.500	6.000	4.000	No	2.1.2 (Full); 3.x (Partial)	27	1x Molex	$159
GeForce 7600 GS	March; 22, 2006	G73B	TSMC; 80 nm	177	100	PCIe; 1.0 x16	400	400 (800)	12:5:12:8	256	DDR2	128	12.80	4.800	2.000	4.800	3.200	Yes	2.1	27	None	$129
GeForce 7650 GS	March; 22, 2006	G73B	TSMC; 80 nm	177	100	PCIe; 1.0 x16	450	400 (800)	12:5:12:8	256	DDR2	128	12.80	4.800	2.000	4.800	3.200	No	2.1	?	None	OEM
GeForce 7600 GT AGP	January; 8, 2007	G73B	TSMC; 80 nm	177	100	AGP; 8x	560	700 (1400)	12:5:12:8	256; 512	GDDR3	128	22.40	6.720	2.800	6.720	4.480	No	2.1	40	1x Molex	$199
GeForce 7600 GT	March; 9, 2006	G73B	TSMC; 80 nm	177	100	PCIe; 1.0 x16	560	700 (1400)	12:5:12:8	256	GDDR3	128	22.40	6.720	2.800	6.720	4.480	Yes	2.1	40	None	$199
GeForce 7600 GT Mac Edition	September; 2, 2006	G73	TSMC; 90 nm	177	125	PCIe; 1.0 x16	560	700 (1400)	12:5:12:8	256	GDDR3	128	22.40	6.720	2.800	6.720	4.480	No	2.1	40	None	OEM
GeForce 7600 GT Mac Edition	September; 2, 2006	G73B	TSMC; 80 nm	177	100	PCIe; 1.0 x16	560	700 (1400)	12:5:12:8	256	GDDR3	128	22.40	6.720	2.800	6.720	4.480	No	2.1	40	None	OEM
GeForce 7800 GS AGP	February; 2, 2006	G70	TSMC; 110 nm	302	333	AGP; 8x	375	600 (1200)	16:6:16:8	256	GDDR3	256	38.40	6.000	2.250	6.000	3.000	No	2.1	75	1x Molex	$299
GeForce 7800 GS+ AGP	September; 28 2006	G71	TSMC; 90 nm	278	196	AGP; 8x	375	600 (1200)	16:6:16:8	256	GDDR3	256	38.40	6.000	2.250	6.000	3.000	No	2.1.2 (Full); 3.x (Partial)	75	1x Molex	$299
GeForce 7800 GS AGP (20 Pipelines)	February; 2, 2006	G70	TSMC; 110 nm	302	333	AGP; 8x	425	625 (1250)	20:7:20:16	512	GDDR3	256	40.00	8.500	2.975	8.500	6.800	No	2.1	75	1x Molex	$499
GeForce 7800 GS+ AGP (20 Pipelines)	September; 28 2006	G71	TSMC; 90 nm	278	196	AGP; 8x	425	625 (1250)	20:7:20:16	512	GDDR3	256	40.00	8.500	2.975	8.500	6.800	No	2.1.2 (Full); 3.x (Partial)	75	1x Molex	$479
GeForce 7800 GS AGP (24 Pipelines)	February; 2, 2006	G70	TSMC; 110 nm	302	333	AGP; 8x	425	625 (1250)	24:8:24:16	512	GDDR3	256	40.00	10.200	3.400	10.200	6.800	No	2.1	75	1x Molex	$499
GeForce 7800 GS+ AGP (24 Pipelines)	September; 28 2006	G71	TSMC; 90 nm	278	196	AGP; 8x	425	625 (1250)	24:8:24:16	512	GDDR3	256	40.00	10.200	3.400	10.200	6.800	No	2.1.2 (Full); 3.x (Partial)	75	1x Molex	$499
GeForce 7800 GT	August; 11, 2005	G70	TSMC; 110 nm	302	333	PCIe; 1.0 x16	400	500 (1000)	20:7:20:16	256	GDDR3	256	32.00	8.000	2.800	8.000	6.400	Yes	2.1	65	1x 6-Pin	$499
GeForce 7800 GT Dual	August; 11, 2005	2x G70	TSMC; 110 nm	2x 302	2x 333	PCIe; 1.0 x16	400	500 (1000)	2x 20:7:20:16	2x 256	GDDR3	2x 256	2x 32.00	2x 8.000	2x 2.800	2x 8.000	2x 6.400	No	2.1	120	1x 6-Pin	$799
GeForce 7800 GTX	June; 22, 2005	G70	TSMC; 110 nm	302	333	PCIe; 1.0 x16	430	600 (1200)	24:8:24:16	256	GDDR3	256	38.40	10.320	3.440	10.320	6.880	Yes	2.1	86	1x 6-Pin	$599
GeForce 7800 GTX 512	November; 14, 2005	G70	TSMC; 110 nm	302	333	PCIe; 1.0 x16	500	800 (1600)	24:8:24:16	512	GDDR3	256	51.20	12.000	4.000	12.000	8.000	Yes	2.1	108	1x 6-Pin	$649
GeForce 7900 GS AGP	April; 2, 2006	G71	TSMC; 90 nm	278	196	AGP; 8x	450	660 (1320)	20:7:20:16	256	GDDR3	256	42.24	9.000	3.150	9.000	7.200	No	2.1.2 (Full); 3.x (Partial)	65	1x Molex	$259
GeForce 7900 GS	May; 1, 2006	G71	TSMC; 90 nm	278	196	PCIe; 1.0 x16	450	660 (1320)	20:7:20:16	256	GDDR3	256	42.24	9.000	3.150	9.000	7.200	Yes	2.1.2 (Full); 3.x (Partial)	49	1x 6-Pin	$259
GeForce 7900 GT	March; 9, 2006	G71	TSMC; 90 nm	278	196	PCIe; 1.0 x16	450	660 (1320)	24:8:24:16	256	GDDR3	256	42.24	10.800	3.600	10.800	7.200	Yes	2.1.2 (Full); 3.x (Partial)	48	1x 6-Pin	$299
GeForce 7900 GTO	October; 1, 2006	G71	TSMC; 90 nm	278	196	PCIe; 1.0 x16	650	660 (1320)	24:8:24:16	512	GDDR3	256	42.24	15.600	5.200	15.600	10.400	Yes	2.1.2 (Full); 3.x (Partial)	81	1x 6-Pin	$249
GeForce 7900 GTX	March; 9, 2006	G71	TSMC; 90 nm	278	196	PCIe; 1.0 x16	650	800 (1600)	24:8:24:16	512	GDDR3	256	51.20	15.600	5.200	15.600	10.400	Yes	2.1.2 (Full); 3.x (Partial)	84	1x 6-Pin	$499
GeForce 7900 GX2	April; 30, 2006	2x G71	TSMC; 90 nm	2x 278	2x 196	PCIe; 1.0 x16	500	600 (1200)	2x 24:8:24:16	2x 512	GDDR3	2x 256	2x 38.40	2x 12.000	2x 4.000	2x 12.000	2x 8.000	Yes	2.1.2 (Full); 3.x (Partial)	110	2x 6-Pin	$599
GeForce 7950 GT AGP	April; 2, 2007	G71	TSMC; 90 nm	278	196	AGP; 8x	500	600 (1200)	24:8:24:16	512	GDDR3	256	38.40	12.000	4.000	12.000	8.000	No	2.1.2 (Full); 3.x (Partial)	65	1x Molex	$269
GeForce 7950 GT	August; 6, 2006	G71	TSMC; 90 nm	278	196	PCIe; 1.0 x16	550	700 (1400)	24:8:24:16	512	GDDR3	256	44.80	13.200	4.400	13.200	8.800	Yes	2.1.2 (Full); 3.x (Partial)	65	1x 6-Pin	$299
GeForce 7950 GX2	June; 5, 2006	2x G71	TSMC; 90 nm	2x 278	2x 196	PCIe; 1.0 x16	500	600 (1200)	2x 24:8:24:16	2x 512	GDDR3	2x 256	2x 38.40	2x 12.000	2x 4.000	2x 12.000	2x 8.000	Quad SLI	2.1.2 (Full); 3.x (Partial)	110	1x 6-Pin	$599
Model	Launch Date	Code Name	Fab (nm)	Transistors (million)	Die Size (mm^{2})	Bus Interface	Core (Boost) (MHz)	Memory (MHz) (MT/s)	Core Config	Size (MB)	Bus Type	Bus Width (bit)	Bandwidth (GB/s)	Pixel Shader (GP/s)	Vertex Shader (GV/s)	Texel (GT/s)	Pixel (GP/s)	SLI	OpenGL	TDP (Watts)	Power Connectors	MSRP (USD)
Model	Launch Date	Code Name	Fab (nm)	Transistors (million)	Die Size (mm^{2})	Bus Interface	Clock Rate		Core Config	Memory Configuration				Compute Throughput		Fillrate		Features		TDP (Watts)	Power Connectors	MSRP (USD)

=== GeForce 8 (8xxx) series ===
- All models support coverage sample anti-aliasing, angle-independent anisotropic filtering, & 128-bit OpenEXR HDR.
- All models support OpenGL 3.3 & Compute Capability 1.1.
- All non-mGPU models support OpenCL 1.1.
- All models support Direct3D 11.1 (10_0) except the 8400 GS Rev. 3, which supports 11.1 (10.1) instead.
- All models built on the 90 nm process support CUDA 1.0, all models built on the 80 nm & 65 nm process support CUDA 1.1, & all models built on the 40 nm process support CUDA 1.2.

Model	Launch Date	Code Name	Fab (nm)	Transistors (million)	Die Size (mm^{2})	Bus Interface	Clock Rate			Core Config	Memory Configuration				Cache L2 (KB)	Fillrate		Processing Power (GFLOPS) Single Precision	Video Engine	SLI	TDP (Watts)	Power Connectors	MSRP (USD)
Model	Launch Date	Code Name	Fab (nm)	Transistors (million)	Die Size (mm^{2})	Bus Interface	Core (MHz)	Shader (MHz)	Memory (MHz) (MT/s)	Core Config	Size (MB)	Bus Type	Bus Width (bit)	Bandwidth (GB/s)	Cache L2 (KB)	Pixel (GP/s)	Texture (GT/s)	Processing Power (GFLOPS) Single Precision	Video Engine	SLI	TDP (Watts)	Power Connectors	MSRP (USD)
GeForce 8100 + nForce 720a	May; 6, 2008	C78	TSMC; 80 nm	210	127	PCI (HyperTransport)	500	1200	System shared up to 400 (800) or 533 (1066)	16:8:4:2	System shared up to 512	System shared DDR2 or DDR3	System shared 64 or 128	System shared up to 12.80 or 17.06	—N/a	2.00	4.00	38.400	PureVideo 3 with VP3; Engine + BSP Engine & AES128	No	40	None	?
GeForce 8200	May; 6, 2008	C78	TSMC; 80 nm	210	127	PCI (HyperTransport)	500	1200	System shared up to 400 (800) or 533 (1066)	16:8:4:2	System shared up to 512	System shared DDR2 or DDR3	System shared 64 or 128	System shared up to 12.80 or 17.06	—N/a	2.00	4.00	38.400	PureVideo 3 with VP3; Engine + BSP Engine & AES128	No	40	None	?
GeForce 8300	May; 6, 2008	C78	TSMC; 80 nm	210	127	PCI (HyperTransport)	500	1500	System shared up to 400 (800) or 533 (1066)	16:8:4:2	System shared up to 512	System shared DDR2 or DDR3	System shared 64 or 128	System shared up to 12.80 or 17.06	—N/a	2.00	4.00	48.000	PureVideo 3 with VP3; Engine + BSP Engine & AES128	No	40	None	?
GeForce 8300 GS	April; 17, 2007	G86S	TSMC; 80 nm	210	127	PCIe; 1.0 x16	459	918	400 (800)	8:8:4:1	128	DDR2	64	6.40	16	1.84	3.67	14.688	PureVideo 2 with VP2; Engine + BSP Engine & AES128	No	40	None	OEM
GeForce 8400	December; 4, 2007	G98S	UMC; 65 nm	210	86	PCIe; 2.0 x16	540	1300	500 (1000)	8:4:4:1	256	DDR2	64	8.00	16	2.16		20.800	PureVideo 2 with VP2; Engine + BSP Engine & AES128	No	25	None	OEM
GeForce 8400 GS PCI	December; 4, 2007	G98S	UMC; 65 nm	210	86	PCI	567	1400	333 (666)	8:4:4:1	512	DDR2	64	5.33	16	2.27		22.400	PureVideo 2 with VP2; Engine + BSP Engine & AES128	No	25	None	~$80
GeForce 8400 GS PCI Rev.2	April; 17, 2007	GT218S	TSMC; 40 nm	260	57	PCI	520	1230	500 (1000)	16:8:4:2	512	DDR3	64	8.00	32	2.08	4.16	39.360	PureVideo 4 with VP4; Engine	No	40	None	~$70
GeForce 8400 SE	August; 1, 2008	G86S	TSMC; 80 nm	210	127	PCIe; 1.0 x16	459	918	400 (800)	16:8:4:2	128; 256; 512	DDR2	64	6.40	16	1.84	3.67	29.376	PureVideo 2 with VP2; Engine + BSP Engine & AES128	No	50	None	OEM
GeForce 8400 GS	April; 17, 2007	G86-213-A2	TSMC; 40 nm	210	127	PCIe; 1.0 x16	459	918	400 (800)	16:8:4:2	256; 512	DDR2	64	6.40	16	1.84	3.67	29.376	PureVideo 2 with VP2; Engine + BSP Engine & AES128	No	40	None	OEM (Note: The 8400 GS eventually became a retail model very shortly after its release at roughly US$60.)
GeForce 8400 GS Rev. 2	December; 4, 2007	G98-409-U2	UMC; 65 nm	210	86	PCIe; 2.0 x16	567	1400	400 (800)	8:8:4:1	512	DDR2	64	6.40	16	2.27		22.400	PureVideo 2 with VP2; Engine + BSP Engine & AES128	No	25	None	~$60
GeForce 8400 GS Rev. 3	July; 12, 2010	GT218S	TSMC; 40 nm	260	57	PCIe; 2.0 x16	520	1230	400 (800)	16:8:4:2	512	DDR2	64	6.40	32	2.08	4.16	39.360	PureVideo 4 with VP4; Engine	No	25	None	~$50
GeForce 8500 GT	April; 17, 2007	G86-300-A2	TSMC; 80 nm	210	127	PCIe; 1.0 x16	459	918	400 (800)	16:8:4:2	256; 512; 1024	GDDR3	128	12.80	32	1.84	3.67	29.376	PureVideo 2 with VP2; Engine + BSP Engine & AES128	2-Way	30	None	$129
GeForce 8600 GS	April; 17, 2007	G84	TSMC; 80 nm	289	169	PCIe; 1.0 x16	540	1190	400 (800)	16:8:8:2	512	DDR2	128	12.80	32	4.32		38.080	PureVideo 2 with VP2; Engine + BSP Engine & AES128	2-Way	47	None	OEM
GeForce 8600 GT	April; 17, 2007	G84-303-A2	TSMC; 80 nm	289	169	PCIe; 1.0 x16	540	1190	700 (1400)	32:16:8:4	512; 1024	GDDR3	128	22.40	32	4.32	8.64	76.160	PureVideo 2 with VP2; Engine + BSP Engine & AES128	2-Way	47	None	$159
GeForce 8600 GT Mac Edition	April; 17, 2007	G84-303-A2	TSMC; 80 nm	289	169	PCIe; 1.0 x16	600	1450	750 (1500)	32:16:8:4	128	GDDR3	128	24.00	32	4.80	9.60	92.800	PureVideo 2 with VP2; Engine + BSP Engine & AES128	2-Way	47	None	$159
GeForce 8600 GTS	April; 17, 2007	G84-400-A2	TSMC; 80 nm	289	169	PCIe; 1.0 x16	675	1450	1000 (2000)	32:16:8:4	256; 512	GDDR3	128	32.00	32	5.40	10.80	92.800	PureVideo 2 with VP2; Engine + BSP Engine & AES128	2-Way	60	1x 6-Pin	$199
GeForce 8600 GTS Mac Edition	September; 21, 2007	G84-400-A2	TSMC; 80 nm	289	169	PCIe; 1.0 x16	675	1450	1008 (2016)	32:16:8:4	512	GDDR3	128	32.26	32	5.40	10.80	92.800	PureVideo 2 with VP2; Engine + BSP Engine & AES128	2-Way	75	1x 6-Pin	$199
GeForce 8800 GS	January; 31, 2008	G92-150-A2	TSMC; 65 nm	754	324	PCIe; 2.0 x16	550	1375	800 (1600)	96:48:12:12	384; 768	GDDR3	192	38.40	48	6.60	26.40	264.000	PureVideo 2 with VP2; Engine + BSP Engine & AES128	2-Way	105	1x 6-Pin	OEM
GeForce 8800 GT	October; 29, 2007	G92-270-A2	TSMC; 65 nm	754	324	PCIe; 2.0 x16	600	1500	900 (1800)	112:56:16:14	512	GDDR3	256	57.60	64	9.60	33.60	336.000	PureVideo 2 with VP2; Engine + BSP Engine & AES128	2-Way	125	1x 6-Pin	$349
GeForce 8800 GT Mac Edition	February; 1, 2008	G92-270-A2	TSMC; 65 nm	754	324	PCIe; 2.0 x16	600	1500	900 (1800)	112:56:16:14	512	GDDR3	256	57.60	64	9.60	33.60	336.000	PureVideo 2 with VP2; Engine + BSP Engine & AES128	2-Way	125	1x 6-Pin	$349
GeForce 8800 GTS 320	February; 12, 2007	G80-100-K0-A2	TSMC; 90 nm	681	484	PCIe; 1.0 x16	513	1188	792 (1584)	96:24:20:12	320	GDDR3	320	63.36	80	10.26	14.36	228.096 (342.144) (Note: The G80 Core could perform 3x ops/clock compared to the typical 2x ops/clock. This was thanks to what NVIDIA called a "SFU" or Special Function Unit, which added roughly 1x op/clock on top of the 2x ops/clock.)	PureVideo 1 with VP1; Engine	2-Way	143	1x 6-Pin	$269
GeForce 8800 GTS 640	November; 8, 2006	G80-100-K0-A2	TSMC; 90 nm	681	484	PCIe; 1.0 x16	513	1188	792 (1584)	96:24:20:12	640	GDDR3	320	63.36	80	10.26	14.36	228.096 (342.144)	PureVideo 1 with VP1; Engine	2-Way	143	1x 6-Pin	$449
GeForce 8800 GTS Core 112	November; 19, 2007	G80-100-K0-A2	TSMC; 90 nm	681	484	PCIe; 1.0 x16	500	1200	800 (1600)	112:28:20:14	640	GDDR3	320	64.00	80	10.00	14.00	268.800 (403.200)	PureVideo 1 with VP1; Engine	2-Way	150	1x 6-Pin	$399
GeForce 8800 GTS 512	December; 11, 2007	G92-400-A2	TSMC; 65 nm	754	324	PCIe; 2.0 x16	650	1625	820 (1600)	128:64:16:16	512	GDDR3	256	52.48	64	10.40	41.60	416.000	PureVideo 2 with VP2; Engine + BSP Engine & AES128	2-Way	135	1x 6-Pin	$349
GeForce 8800 GTX	November; 8, 2006	G80-300-A2	TSMC; 90 nm	681	484	PCIe; 1.0 x16	576	1350	900 (1800)	128:32:24:16	768	GDDR3	384	86.40	96	13.82	18.43	345.600 (518.400)	PureVideo 1 with VP1; Engine	3-Way	155	2x 6-Pin	$599
GeForce 8800 Ultra	May; 2, 2007	G80-450-A3	TSMC; 90 nm	681	484	PCIe; 1.0 x16	612	1512	1080 (2160)	128:32:24:16	768	GDDR3	384	103.70	96	14.69	19.58	387.072 (580.608)	PureVideo 1 with VP1; Engine	3-Way	171	2x 6-Pin	$829
Model	Launch Date	Code Name	Fab (nm)	Transistors (million)	Die Size (mm^{2})	Bus Interface	Core (MHz)	Shader (MHz)	Memory (MHz) (MT/s)	Core Config	Size (MB)	Bus Type	Bus Width (bit)	Bandwidth (GB/s)	Cache L2 (KB)	Pixel (GP/s)	Texture (GT/s)	Processing Power (GFLOPS) Single Precision	Video Engine	SLI	TDP (Watts)	Power Connectors	MSRP (USD)
Model	Launch Date	Code Name	Fab (nm)	Transistors (million)	Die Size (mm^{2})	Bus Interface	Clock Rate			Core Config	Memory Configuration				Cache L2 (KB)	Fillrate		Processing Power (GFLOPS) Single Precision	Video Engine	SLI	TDP (Watts)	Power Connectors	MSRP (USD)

=== GeForce 9 (9xxx) series ===
- All models support Coverage Sample Anti-Aliasing, Angle-Independent Anisotropic Filtering, & 128-bit OpenEXR HDR.
- All models support Direct3D 11.1 (10_0), OpenGL 3.3, CUDA 1.1, & Compute Capability 1.1.
- All non-mGPU models support OpenCL 1.1.
- All models support 2-Way SLI except for the 9800 GTX & 9800 GTX+ which support 3-Way.

Model	Launch Date	Code Name	Fab (nm)	Transistors (million)	Die Size (mm^{2})	Bus Interface	Clock Rate			Core Config	Memory Configuration				Cache L2 (KB)	Fillrate		Processing Power (GFLOPS)	Video Engine	TDP (Watts)	Power Connectors	MSRP USD
Model	Launch Date	Code Name	Fab (nm)	Transistors (million)	Die Size (mm^{2})	Bus Interface	Core (MHz)	Shader (MHz)	Memory (MHz) (MT/s)	Core Config	Size (MB)	Bus Type	Bus Width (bit)	Bandwidth (GB/s)	Cache L2 (KB)	Pixel (GP/s)	Texture (GT/s)	Processing Power (GFLOPS)	Video Engine	TDP (Watts)	Power Connectors	MSRP USD
GeForce 9100	May; 6, 2008	C78	TSMC; 80 nm	210	127	PCI	500	1200	System shared up to 400 (800) or 533 (1066)	16:8:4:2	System shared up to 1536	System shared DDR2 or DDR3	System shared 64 or 128	System shared up to 12.80 or 17.06	—N/a	2.00	4.00	38.400	PureVideo 3 with VP3; Engine + BSP Engine & AES128	?	None	?
GeForce 9200	May; 6, 2008	C78	TSMC; 80 nm	210	127	PCI	500	1200	System shared up to 400 (800) or 533 (1066)	16:8:4:2	System shared up to 1536	System shared DDR2 or DDR3	System shared 64 or 128	System shared up to 12.80 or 17.06	—N/a	2.00	4.00	38.400	PureVideo 3 with VP3; Engine + BSP Engine & AES128	?	None	?
GeForce 9200 (C79 Core)	June; 18, 2008	C79	TSMC; 65 nm	314	144	PCI	450	1100	System shared up to 400 (800) or 533 (1066)	16:8:4:2	System shared up to 1536	System shared DDR2 or DDR3	System shared 64 or 128	System shared up to 12.80 or 17.06	—N/a	1.80	3.60	35.200	PureVideo 3 with VP3; Engine + BSP Engine & AES128	?	None	?
GeForce 9300 + nForce 730i	June; 18, 2008	C79	TSMC; 65 nm	314	144	PCI	450	1100	System shared up to 400 (800) or 533 (1066)	16:8:4:2	System shared up to 1536	System shared DDR2 or DDR3	System shared 64 or 128	System shared up to 12.80 or 17.06	—N/a	1.80	3.60	35.200	PureVideo 3 with VP3; Engine + BSP Engine & AES128	?	None	?
GeForce 9400	June; 18, 2008	C79	TSMC; 65 nm	314	144	PCI	450	1100	System shared up to 400 (800) or 533 (1066)	16:8:4:2	System shared up to 1536	System shared DDR2 or DDR3	System shared 64 or 128	System shared up to 12.80 or 17.06	—N/a	1.80	3.60	35.200	PureVideo 3 with VP3; Engine + BSP Engine & AES128	?	None	?
GeForce 9400 (C7A Core)	October; 15, 2008	C7A	TSMC; 80 nm	210	127	PCI	580	1400	System shared up to 400 (800) or 533 (1066)	16:8:4:2	System shared up to 1536	System shared DDR2 or DDR3	System shared 64 or 128	System shared up to 12.80 or 17.06	—N/a	2.32	4.64	44.800	PureVideo 3 with VP3; Engine + BSP Engine & AES128	?	None	?
GeForce 9300 SE	June; 1, 2008	G98S	TSMC; 65 nm	210	86	PCIe; 2.0 x16	540	1300	400 (800)	8:4:4:1	256	DDR2	64	6.40	16	2.16		20.800	PureVideo 2 with VP2; Engine + BSP Engine & AES128	25	None	OEM
GeForce 9300 GE	June; 1, 2008	G98	TSMC; 55 nm	210	80	PCIe; 2.0 x16	540	1300	400 (800)	8:4:4:1	256	DDR2	64	6.40	16	2.16		20.800	PureVideo 2 with VP2; Engine + BSP Engine & AES128	50	None	OEM
GeForce 9300 GS	June; 1, 2008	G98S	TSMC; 65 nm	210	86	PCIe; 2.0 x16	567	1400	333 (666)	8:4:4:1	512	DDR2	64	5.33	16	2.27		22.400	PureVideo 2 with VP2; Engine + BSP Engine & AES128	35	None	OEM
GeForce 9300 GS Rev. 2	March; 12, 2011	GT218-670-B1	TSMC; 40 nm	260	57	PCIe; 2.0 x16	589	1402	333 (666)	16:8:4:2	256	DDR2	64	5.33	32	2.36	4.71	44.864	PureVideo 4 with VP4; Engine	?	None	OEM
GeForce 9400 GT (G86 Core)	August; 1 2008	G86S	TSMC; 80 nm	210	127	PCIe; 2.0 x16	459	918	600 (1200)	16:8:4:2	128; 256; 512	DDR2	64	9.60	16	1.836	3.672	29.376	PureVideo 2 with VP2; Engine + BSP Engine & AES128	50	None	?
GeForce 9400 GT PCI	August; 27, 2008	G96-200-C1	TSMC; 55 nm	314	121	PCI	550	1400	400 (800)	16:8:4:2	256	DDR2	128	12.80	32	2.20	4.40	44.800	PureVideo 2 with VP2; Engine + BSP Engine & AES128	50	None	?
GeForce 9400 GT	August; 27, 2008	G96-200-C1	TSMC; 55 nm	314	121	PCIe; 2.0 x16	550	1400	400 (800)	16:8:4:2	512	DDR2	128	12.80	32	2.20	4.40	44.800	PureVideo 2 with VP2; Engine + BSP Engine & AES128	50	None	?
GeForce 9400 GT Rev. 2	August; 27, 2008	G96-200-C1	TSMC; 55 nm	314	121	PCIe; 2.0 x16	550	1400	400 (800)	16:8:4:2	512; 1024	GDDR3	128	12.80	32	2.20	4.40	44.800	PureVideo 2 with VP2; Engine + BSP Engine & AES128	50	None	?
GeForce 9400 GT Rev. 3	June; 13, 2012	GT218-670-B1	TSMC; 40 nm	260	57	PCIe; 2.0 x16	589	1402	600 (1200)	16:8:4:2	128	DDR2	64	9.60	32	2.36	4.71	44.864	PureVideo 4 with VP4; Engine	50	None	?
GeForce 9500 GS	July; 29, 2008	G96-259-A1	UMC; 65 nm	314	144	PCIe; 2.0 x16	550	1375	504 (1008)	32:16:8:4	512	DDR2	128	16.13	32	4.40	8.80	88.000	PureVideo 2 with VP2; Engine + BSP Engine & AES128	40	None	OEM
GeForce 9500 GS Rev. 2	July; 29, 2008	G96C	TSMC; 55 nm	314	121	PCIe; 2.0 x16	500	1250	500 (1000)	32:16:8:4	512	DDR2	128	16.00	32	4.00	8.00	80.000	PureVideo 2 with VP2; Engine + BSP Engine & AES128	40	None	OEM
GeForce 9500 GT	July; 29, 2008	G96-300-C1	UMC; 65 nm	314	144	PCIe; 2.0 x16	600	1500	1000 (2000)	32:16:8:4	512	GDDR3	128	32.00	32	4.80	9.60	96.000	PureVideo 2 with VP2; Engine + BSP Engine & AES128	50	None	?
GeForce 9500 GT Rev. 2	July; 29, 2008	G96-309-B1	UMC; 55 nm	314	121	PCIe; 2.0 x16	600	1500	900 (1800)	32:16:8:4	512	GDDR3	128	28.80	32	4.80	9.60	96.000	PureVideo 2 with VP2; Engine + BSP Engine & AES128	50	None	?
GeForce 9500 GT Rev. 3	July; 29, 2008	G96-300-C1	TSMC; 55 nm	314	121	PCIe; 2.0 x16	550	1400	800 (1600)	32:16:8:4	512	GDDR3	128	25.60	32	4.40	8.80	89.600	PureVideo 2 with VP2; Engine + BSP Engine & AES128	50	None	?
GeForce 9500 GT Mac Edition	May; 19, 2010	G96C	TSMC; 55 nm	314	121	PCIe; 2.0 x16	550	1400	800 (1600)	32:16:8:4	512	GDDR3	128	25.60	32	4.40	8.80	89.600	PureVideo 2 with VP2; Engine + BSP Engine & AES128	50	None	OEM
GeForce 9600 GS	July; 29, 2008	G94-300-A1	TSMC; 65 nm	505	240	PCIe; 2.0 x16	500	1250	1000 (2000)	48:24:12:6	768	DDR2	192	48.00	48	6.00	12.00	120.000	PureVideo 2 with VP2; Engine + BSP Engine & AES128	?	1x 6-Pin	OEM
GeForce 9600 GSO	April; 28, 2008	G92-150-A2	TSMC; 65 nm	754	324	PCIe; 2.0 x16	550	1375	800 (1600)	96:48:12:12	384; 768; 1536	GDDR3	192	38.40	48	6.60	26.40	264.000	PureVideo 2 with VP2; Engine + BSP Engine & AES128	84	1x 6-Pin	$169
GeForce 9600 GSO 512	October; 23, 2008	G94-300-A1; G94B	TSMC; 65 nm 55 nm	505	240; 196	PCIe; 2.0 x16	650	1625	900 (1800)	48:24:16:6	512	GDDR3	256	57.60	64	10.40	15.60	156.000	PureVideo 2 with VP2; Engine + BSP Engine & AES128	90	1x 6-Pin	$189
GeForce 9600 GT Green Edition	February; 21, 2008	G94-300-A1; G94B	TSMC; 65 nm 55 nm	505	240; 196	PCIe; 2.0 x16	600	1500	700 (1400)	64:32:16:8	512; 1024	GDDR3	256	44.80	64	9.60	19.20	192.000	PureVideo 2 with VP2; Engine + BSP Engine & AES128	59 (Note: Core voltage is limited to 1.00v to maintain a lower TDP)	None	$179
GeForce 9600 GT	February; 21, 2008	G94-300-A1	TSMC; 65 nm	505	240	PCIe; 2.0 x16	650	1625	900 (1800)	64:32:16:8	512; 1024	GDDR3	256	57.60	64	10.40	20.80	208.000	PureVideo 2 with VP2; Engine + BSP Engine & AES128	95	1x 6-Pin	$179
GeForce 9600 GT Rev. 2	February; 21, 2008	G94-358-B1	TSMC; 55 nm	505	196	PCIe; 2.0 x16	650	1625	900 (1800)	64:32:16:8	512; 1024	GDDR3	256	57.60	64	10.40	20.80	208.000	PureVideo 2 with VP2; Engine + BSP Engine & AES128	95	1x 6-Pin	$179
GeForce 9600 GT Mac Edition	December; 22, 2008	G94-300-A1	TSMC; 65 nm	505	240	PCIe; 2.0 x16	600	1500	266 (532)	64:32:16:8	1024	DDR2	256	17.02	64	9.60	19.20	192.000	PureVideo 2 with VP2; Engine + BSP Engine & AES128	95	1x 6-Pin	OEM
GeForce 9600 GTX	May; 27, 2009	G92	TSMC; 65 nm	754	324	PCIe; 2.0 x16	580	1450	700 (1400)	96:48:16:12	512	GDDR3	256	44.80	64	9.28	27.84	278.400	PureVideo 2 with VP2; Engine + BSP Engine & AES128	140	1x 6-Pin	?
GeForce 9800 GT	July; 21, 2008	G92-270-A2; G92-280-B1	TSMC; 65 nm 55 nm	754	324; 260	PCIe; 2.0 x16	600	1500	900 (1800)	112:56:16:14	512; 1024	GDDR3	256	57.0	64	9.60	33.60	336.000	PureVideo 2 with VP2; Engine + BSP Engine & AES128	125	1x 6-Pin	$159
GeForce 9800 GT Rebrand	July; 21, 2008	G92-270-A2	TSMC; 65 nm	754	324	PCIe; 2.0 x16	725	1750	1000 (2000)	128:64:16:16	512	GDDR3	256	64.00	64	11.60	46.40	448.000	PureVideo 2 with VP2; Engine + BSP Engine & AES128	125	1x 6-Pin	$159
GeForce 9800 GTX	March; 28, 2008	G92-420-A2	TSMC; 65 nm	754	324	PCIe; 2.0 x16	675	1688	1100 (2200)	128:64:16:16	512	GDDR3	256	70.40	64	10.80	43.20	432.128	PureVideo 2 with VP2; Engine + BSP Engine & AES128	140	2x 6-Pin	$299
GeForce 9800 GTX+	July 16, 2008	G92-420-B1	TSMC; 55 nm	754	260	PCIe; 2.0 x16	738	1836	1100 (2200)	128:64:16:16	512	GDDR3	256	70.40	64	11.81	47.23	470.016	PureVideo 2 with VP2; Engine + BSP Engine & AES128	141	2x 6-Pin	$229
GeForce 9800 GX2	March; 18, 2008	2× G92-450-A2	TSMC/UMC; 65 nm	2× 754	2× 324	PCIe; 2.0 x16	600	1500	1000 (2000)	2× 128:64:16:16	2× 512	GDDR3	2× 256	2× 64.00	2x 64	2× 9.60	2× 38.40	2× 384.000	PureVideo 2 with VP2; Engine + BSP Engine & AES128	197	1x 6-Pin + 1x 8-Pin	$599
Model	Launch Date	Code Name	Fab (nm)	Transistors (million)	Die Size (mm^{2})	Bus Interface	Core (MHz)	Shader (MHz)	Memory (MHz) (MT/s)	Core Config	Size (MB)	Bus Type	Bus Width (bit)	Bandwidth (GB/s)	Cache L2 (KB)	Pixel (GP/s)	Texture (GT/s)	Processing Power (GFLOPS)	Video Engine	TDP (Watts)	Power Connectors	MSRP USD
Model	Launch Date	Code Name	Fab (nm)	Transistors (million)	Die Size (mm^{2})	Bus Interface	Clock Rate			Core Config	Memory Configuration				Cache L2 (KB)	Fillrate		Processing Power (GFLOPS)	Video Engine	TDP (Watts)	Power Connectors	MSRP USD

=== GeForce 100 series ===
- All models are OEM only and support Direct3D 11.1 (10_0), OpenGL 3.3, OpenCL 1.1, & CUDA 1.1.

Model	Launch Date	Code Name	Fab (nm)	Transistors (million)	Die Size (mm^{2})	Bus Interface	Clock Rate			Core Config	Memory Configuration				Cache L2 (KB)	Fillrate		Processing Power (GFLOPS)	TDP (Watts)	Power Connectors
Model	Launch Date	Code Name	Fab (nm)	Transistors (million)	Die Size (mm^{2})	Bus Interface	Core (MHz)	Shader (MHz)	Memory (MHz) (MT/s)	Core Config	Size (MB)	DRAM Type	Bus Width (bit)	Bandwidth (GB/s)	Cache L2 (KB)	Pixel (GP/s)	Texture (GT/s)	Processing Power (GFLOPS)	TDP (Watts)	Power Connectors
GeForce G 100 OEM	March; 10, 2009	G98-309-U2	UMC; 65 nm	210	86	PCIe; 2.0 x16	540	1300	400 (800)	8:4:4:1	256	DDR2	64	6.40	16	2.16		20.800	35	None
GeForce GT 120 OEM	March; 10, 2009	G96C	TSMC; 55 nm	314	121	PCIe; 2.0 x16	738	1836	504 (1008)	32:16:8:4	512	DDR2	128	16.13	32	5.90	11.81	117.504	50	None
GeForce GT 120 Mac Edition	January; 20, 2009	G96C	TSMC; 55 nm	314	121	PCIe; 2.0 x16	550	1400	800 (1600)	32:16:8:4	512	GDDR3	128	25.60	32	4.40	8.80	89.600	50	None
GeForce GT 130 OEM	March; 10, 2009	G94B	TSMC; 55 nm	505	196	PCIe; 2.0 x16	500	1250	500 (1000)	48:24:12:6	512	DDR2	192	24.00	48	6.00	12.00	120.000	75	1x 6-Pin
GeForce GT 130 Mac Edition	December; 12, 2008	G94B	TSMC; 55 nm	505	196	PCIe; 2.0 x16	600	1500	792 (1584)	48:24:12:6	512	GDDR3	192	38.02	48	7.20	14.40	144.000	75	1x 6-Pin
GeForce GT 140 OEM	March; 10, 2009	G94B	TSMC; 55 nm	505	196	PCIe; 2.0 x16	650	1625	900 (1800)	64:32:16:8	1024	GDDR3	256	57.60	64	10.40	20.80	208.000	105	1x 6-Pin
GeForce GTS 150 OEM	March; 10, 2009	G92	TSMC; 65 nm	754	324	PCIe; 2.0 x16	738	1836	1000 (2000)	128:64:16:16	1024	GDDR3	256	64.00	64	11.81	47.23	470.016	141	2x 6-Pin

=== GeForce 200 series ===
- All models support Coverage Sample Anti-Aliasing, Angle-Independent Anisotropic Filtering, 240-bit OpenEXR HDR.
- All models support Direct3D 10.0 and OpenGL 3.3, except the GeForce 205, 210, 220, & GT 240, which support Direct3D 10.1 instead.
- Compute Capability: 1.1 (G92 [GTS250] GPU).
- Compute Capability: 1.2 (GT215, GT216, GT218 GPUs).
- Compute Capability: 1.3 has double precision support for use in GPGPU applications (GT200a/b GPUs only).

Model	Launch Date	Code Name	Fab (nm)	Transistors (million)	Die Size (mm^{2})	Bus Interface	Clock Rate			Core Config	Memory Configuration				Cache L2 (KB)	Fillrate		Processing Power (GFLOPS)		Video Engine	SLI	TDP (Watts)	Power Connectors	MSRP (USD)
Model	Launch Date	Code Name	Fab (nm)	Transistors (million)	Die Size (mm^{2})	Bus Interface	Core (MHz)	Shader (MHz)	Memory (MHz) (GT/s)	Core Config	Size (MB)	DRAM Type	Bus Width (bit)	Bandwidth (GB/s)	Cache L2 (KB)	Pixel (GP/s)	Texture (GT/s)	Single Precision FP32	Double Precision FP64 (1:8)	Video Engine	SLI	TDP (Watts)	Power Connectors	MSRP (USD)
GeForce 205 OEM	November; 26, 2009	GT218	TSMC; 40 nm	260	57	PCIe; 2.0 x16	589	1402	400 (0.8)	16:8:4:2	512	DDR2	64	6.4	32	2.36	4.71	44.864	—N/a	PureVideo 4 with VP4; Engine	No	30.5	None	OEM
GeForce 210 PCI	October; 12, 2009	GT216	TSMC; 40 nm	486	100	PCI	475	1100	400 (0.8)	16:8:4:2	512	DDR2	64	6.4	32	1.90	3.80	35.200	—N/a	PureVideo 4 with VP4; Engine	No	30.5	None	$29
GeForce 210	October; 12, 2009	GT218-300-A2	TSMC; 40 nm	260	57	PCIe; 2.0 x16	520	1230	400 (0.8)	16:8:4:2	512	DDR3	64	6.4	32	2.08	4.16	39.360	—N/a	PureVideo 4 with VP4; Engine	No	30.5	None	$29
GeForce 210 Rev. 2	October; 12, 2009	GT218-325-B1	TSMC; 40 nm	260	57	PCIe; 2.0 x16	520	1230	400 (0.8)	16:8:4:2	1024	DDR3	64	6.4	32	2.08	4.16	39.360	—N/a	PureVideo 4 with VP4; Engine	No	30.5	None	$29
GeForce 210 OEM	September; 4, 2009	GT216	TSMC; 40 nm	486	100	PCIe; 2.0 x16	475	1100	400 (0.8)	16:8:4:2	1024	DDR2	64	6.4	32	1.90	3.80	35.200	—N/a	PureVideo 4 with VP4; Engine	No	30.5	None	OEM
GeForce G210 OEM	May; 26, 2009	G96C	TSMC; 55 nm	314	121	PCIe; 1.0 x16	550	1350	504 (1.0)	16:8:4:2	512	DDR2	64	8.1	32	2.20	4.40	43.200	—N/a	PureVideo 4 with VP4; Engine	No	30.5	None	OEM
GeForce G210 OEM Rev. 2	August; 24, 2009	GT218-200-B1	TSMC; 40 nm	260	57	PCIe; 2.0 x16	589	1402	400 (0.8)	16:8:4:2	128	DDR2	64	6.4	32	2.36	4.71	44.864	—N/a	PureVideo 4 with VP4; Engine	No	30.5	None	OEM
GeForce G210 OEM Rev. 2	August; 24, 2009	GT218-200-B1	TSMC; 40 nm	260	57	PCIe; 2.0 x16	589	1402	400 (0.8)	16:8:4:2	128	GDDR3	64	6.4	32	2.36	4.71	44.864	—N/a	PureVideo 4 with VP4; Engine	No	30.5	None	OEM
GeForce G210 OEM Rev. 2	August; 24, 2009	GT218-200-B1	TSMC; 40 nm	260	57	PCIe; 2.0 x16	589	1402	400 (0.8)	16:8:4:2	256	DDR2	64	6.4	32	2.36	4.71	44.864	—N/a	PureVideo 4 with VP4; Engine	No	30.5	None	OEM
GeForce G210 OEM Rev. 2	August; 24, 2009	GT218-200-B1	TSMC; 40 nm	260	57	PCIe; 2.0 x16	589	1402	400 (0.8)	16:8:4:2	512	DDR2	64	6.4	32	2.36	4.71	44.864	—N/a	PureVideo 4 with VP4; Engine	No	30.5	None	OEM
GeForce G210 OEM Rev. 2	August; 24, 2009	GT218-200-B1	TSMC; 40 nm	260	57	PCIe; 2.0 x16	589	1402	400 (0.8)	16:8:4:2	512	DDR3	64	6.4	32	2.36	4.71	44.864	—N/a	PureVideo 4 with VP4; Engine	No	30.5	None	OEM
GeForce G210 OEM Rev. 2	August; 24, 2009	GT218-200-B1	TSMC; 40 nm	260	57	PCIe; 2.0 x16	589	1402	400 (0.8)	16:8:4:2	1024	DDR3	64	6.4	32	2.36	4.71	44.864	—N/a	PureVideo 4 with VP4; Engine	No	30.5	None	OEM
GeForce GT 220	October; 12, 2009	GT216-055-A3	TSMC; 40 nm	486	100	PCIe; 2.0 x16	625	1360	400 (0.8); 790 (1.58)	48:16:8:6	512; 1024	DDR2; GDDR3	128	12.8; 25.3	64	5.00	10.00	130.560	—N/a	PureVideo 4 with VP4; Engine	No	58	None	$49
GeForce GT 220	January; 26, 2010	G94	TSMC; 65 nm	505	240	PCIe; 2.0 x16	600	1500	700 (1.4)	48:24:8:6	1024	GDDR3	128	22.4	64	4.80	14.40	144.000	—N/a	PureVideo 4 with VP4; Engine	No	58	None	$49
GeForce GT 220 OEM	October; 12, 2009	GT215-450-A2	TSMC; 40 nm	727	144	PCIe; 2.0 x16	506	1012	700 (1.4)	48:16:8:6	512; 1024	GDDR3	128	22.4	64	4.05	8.10	97.152	—N/a	PureVideo 4 with VP4; Engine	No	58	None	OEM
GeForce GT 230	October; 12, 2009	G94-300-B1	TSMC; 55 nm	505	196	PCIe; 2.0 x16	650	1625	900 (1.8)	48:24:16:6	512; 1024	GDDR3	256	57.6	64	10.40	15.60	156.000	—N/a	PureVideo 4 with VP4; Engine	No	75	None	$44
GeForce GT 230 OEM	April 27, 2009	G92-159-B1	TSMC; 55 nm	754	260	PCIe; 2.0 x16	500	1250	500 (1.0)	96:48:12:12	1536	DDR2	192	24.0	48	6.00	18.00	240.000	—N/a	PureVideo 4 with VP4; Engine	No	75	None	OEM
GeForce GT 240	November; 17, 2009	GT215-450-A2	TSMC; 40 nm	727	144	PCIe; 2.0 x16	550	1340	850 (3.4)	96:32:8:12	1024	GDDR5	128	54.4	64	4.40	17.60	257.280	—N/a	PureVideo 4 with VP4; Engine	No	69	None	$79
GeForce GTS 240 OEM	July; 1, 2009	G92-240-B1	TSMC; 55 nm	754	260	PCIe; 2.0 x16	675	1620	1100 (2.2)	112:56:16:14	1024	GDDR3	256	70.4	64	10.80	37.80	362.880	—N/a	PureVideo 2 with VP2; Engine + BSP Engine & AES 240	3-Way	120	1x 6-Pin	OEM
GeForce GTS 250	March; 4, 2009	G92-426-B1	TSMC; 55 nm	754	260	PCIe; 2.0 x16	675	1620	1008 (2.0)	128:64:16:16	1024	GDDR3	256	64.5	64	10.80	43.20	414.720	—N/a	PureVideo 2 with VP2; Engine + BSP Engine & AES 240	3-Way	150	1x 6-Pin	$199
GeForce GTS 250	March; 4, 2009	G92-428-B1	TSMC; 55 nm	754	260	PCIe; 2.0 x16	702	1512	1000 (2.0)	128:64:16:16	1024	GDDR3	256	64.0	64	11.23	44.93	387.072	—N/a	PureVideo 2 with VP2; Engine + BSP Engine & AES 240	3-Way	150	1x 6-Pin	$199
GeForce GTX 260	June; 16, 2008	G200-100-A2	TSMC; 65 nm	1400	576	PCIe; 2.0 x16	576	1242	999 (2.0)	192:64:28:24	896	GDDR3	448	111.9	224	16.13	36.86	476.928	59.616	PureVideo 2 with VP2; Engine + BSP Engine & AES 240	3-Way	182	2x 6-Pin	$449
GeForce GTX 260 Rev. 2	July; 23, 2008	G200-103-B2	TSMC; 55 nm	1400	576	PCIe; 2.0 x16	576	1242	999 (2.0)	192:64:28:24	896	GDDR3	448	111.9	224	16.13	36.86	476.928	59.616	PureVideo 2 with VP2; Engine + BSP Engine & AES 240	3-Way	182	2x 6-Pin	$449
GeForce GTX 260 Core 216	September; 16, 2008	G200-103-A2	TSMC; 65 nm	1400	576	PCIe; 2.0 x16	576	1242	999 (2.0)	216:72:28:27	896	GDDR3	448	111.9	224	16.13	41.47	536.544	67.068	PureVideo 2 with VP2; Engine + BSP Engine & AES 240	3-Way	182	2x 6-Pin	$299
GeForce GTX 260 Core 216 Rev. 2	November; 27, 2008	G200-103-B2	TSMC; 55 nm	1400	576	PCIe; 2.0 x16	576	1242	999 (2.0)	216:72:28:27	896	GDDR3	448	111.9	224	16.13	41.47	536.544	67.068	PureVideo 2 with VP2; Engine + BSP Engine & AES 240	3-Way	171	2x 6-Pin	$299
GeForce GTX 260 OEM	December; 8, 2009	G200-101-A2	TSMC; 65 nm	1400	576	PCIe; 2.0 x16	518	1080	1008 (2.0)	192:64:28:24	1792	GDDR3	448	112.9	224	14.50	33.15	414.720	51.840	PureVideo 2 with VP2; Engine + BSP Engine & AES 240	3-Way	150	2x 6-Pin	OEM
GeForce GTX 275	January; 15, 2009	G200-105-B3	TSMC; 55 nm	1400	470	PCIe; 2.0 x16	633	1404	1134 (2.3)	240:80:28:30	896	GDDR3	448	127.0	224	17.72	50.64	673.920	84.240	PureVideo 2 with VP2; Engine + BSP Engine & AES 240	3-Way	219	2x 6-Pin	$249
GeForce GTX 275 PhysX Edition (Note: The GTX 275 PhysX Edition uses a modified GTS 250 core to handle the PhysX calculations, while the GTX 275 core handles the rest of the graphics.)	February; 16, 2010	G92-428-B1 + G200-105-B3	TSMC; 55 nm	754 + 1400	260 + 470	PCIe; 2.0 x16	738 + 633	1836 + 1296	1100 (2.2) + 1134 (2.3)	128:48:12:16 + 240:80:28:30	384 + 896	GDDR3	192 + 448	52.8 + 127.0	64 + 224	8.86 + 17.72	35.42 + 50.64	470.016 + 622.080	n/a + 77.760	PureVideo 2 with VP2; Engine + BSP Engine & AES 240	3-Way	219	1x 6-Pin + 1x 8-Pin	$349
GeForce GTX 280	June; 16, 2008	G200-300-A2	TSMC; 65 nm	1400	576	PCIe; 2.0 x16	602	1296	1107 (2.2)	240:80:32:30	1024	GDDR3	512	141.7	256	19.26	48.16	622.080	77.760	PureVideo 2 with VP2; Engine + BSP Engine & AES 240	3-Way	236	1x 6-Pin + 1x 8-Pin	$649
GeForce GTX 285	January; 15, 2009	GT200-350-B3	TSMC; 55 nm	1400	470	PCIe; 2.0 x16	648	1476	1242 (2.5)	240:80:32:30	1024	GDDR3	512	159.0	256	20.74	51.84	708.480	88.560	PureVideo 2 with VP2; Engine + BSP Engine & AES 240	3-Way (Note: 4-Way SLI is supported for the EVGA 285 Classified model.)	204	2x 6-Pin	$359
GeForce GTX 285 Mac Edition	January; 15, 2009	GT200-350-B3	TSMC; 55 nm	1400	470	PCIe; 2.0 x16	648	1476	1242 (2.5)	240:80:32:30	1024	GDDR3	512	159.0	256	20.74	51.84	708.480	88.560	PureVideo 2 with VP2; Engine + BSP Engine & AES 240	3-Way	204	2x 6-Pin	OEM
GeForce GTX 285 X2	June; 17, 2009	2x G200-350-B3	TSMC; 55 nm	1400	470	PCIe; 2.0 x16	648	1476	1152 (2.3)	2x 240:80:32:30	2x 2048	GDDR3	2x 512	2x 147.5	2x 256	2x 20.74	2x 51.84	2x 708.480	2x 88.560	PureVideo 2 with VP2; Engine + BSP Engine & AES 240	3-Way	315	2x 8-Pin	$1,399
GeForce GTX 295	January; 18, 2009	2× G200-400-B3	TSMC; 55 nm	2× 1400	2× 470	PCIe; 2.0 x16	576	1242	999 (2.0)	2× 240:80:28:30	2× 896	GDDR3	2× 448	111.9	2x 224	2× 16.13	2× 46.08	2x 596.160	2x 74.520	PureVideo 2 with VP2; Engine + BSP Engine & AES 240	3-Way	289	1x 6-Pin + 1x 8-Pin	$499
GeForce GTX 295 Single PCB	June; 16, 2009	2× G200-401-B3	TSMC; 55 nm	2× 1400	2× 470	PCIe; 2.0 x16	576	1242	1008 (2.0)	2× 240:80:28:30	2× 896	GDDR3	2× 448	112.9	2x 224	2× 16.13	2× 46.08	2x 596.160	2x 74.520	PureVideo 2 with VP2; Engine + BSP Engine & AES 240	3-Way	289	1x 6-Pin + 1x 8-Pin	$499
Model	Launch Date	Code Name	Fab (nm)	Transistors (million)	Die Size (mm^{2})	Bus Interface	Core (MHz)	Shader (MHz)	Memory (GT/s)	Core Config	Size (MB)	DRAM Type	Bus Width (bit)	Bandwidth (GB/s)	Cache L2 (KB)	Pixel (GP/s)	Texture (GT/s)	Single Precision FP32	Double Precision FP64 (1:8)	Video Engine	SLI	TDP (Watts)	Power Connectors	MSRP (USD)
Model	Launch Date	Code Name	Fab (nm)	Transistors (million)	Die Size (mm^{2})	Bus Interface	Clock Rate			Core Config	Memory Configuration				Cache L2 (KB)	Fillrate		Processing Power (GFLOPS)		Video Engine	SLI	TDP (Watts)	Power Connectors	MSRP (USD)

=== GeForce 300 series ===
- All models are OEM only using no power connectors and support Direct3D 11.1 (10_1), OpenGL 3.3, & CUDA 1.2.

Model	Launch Date	Code Name	Fab (nm)	Transistors (million)	Die Size (mm^{2})	Bus Interface	Clock Rate			Core Config	Memory Configuration				Cache L2 (KB)	Fillrate		Processing Power (GFLOPS)	TDP (Watts)
Model	Launch Date	Code Name	Fab (nm)	Transistors (million)	Die Size (mm^{2})	Bus Interface	Core (MHz)	Shader (MHz)	Memory (MHz) (GT/s)	Core Config	Size (MB)	DRAM Type	Bus Width (bit)	Bandwidth (GB/s)	Cache L2 (KB)	Pixel (GP/s)	Texture (GT/s)	Processing Power (GFLOPS)	TDP (Watts)
GeForce 310	November; 27, 2009	GT218-300-A2	TSMC; 40 nm	260	57	PCIe; 2.0 x16	589	1402	333 (0.7)	16:8:4:2	512	DDR2	64	5.33	32	2.36	4.71	44.860	31
GeForce 315	February; 22, 2011	GT218-300-B1	TSMC; 40 nm	260	57	PCIe; 2.0 x16	589	1402	600 (1.2)	16:8:4:2	1024	DDR3	64	9.60	32	2.36	4.71	44.860	33
GeForce 315	April; 28, 2011	GT215-450-A2	TSMC; 40 nm	727	144	PCIe; 2.0 x16	506	1012	350 (0.7)	48:16:4:6	256	DDR2	64	5.60	32	2.02	8.10	97.150	33
GeForce 315	April; 28, 2011	GT215-450-A2	TSMC; 40 nm	727	144	PCIe; 2.0 x16	506	1012	350 (0.7)	48:16:4:6	512	DDR3	64	5.60	32	2.02	8.10	97.150	33
GeForce 315	April; 28, 2011	GT215-450-A2	TSMC; 40 nm	727	144	PCIe; 2.0 x16	506	1012	350 (0.7)	48:16:4:6	128	GDDR3	64	5.60	32	2.02	8.10	97.150	33
GeForce 315	March; 31, 2010	GT216	TSMC; 40 nm	486	100	PCIe; 2.0 x16	475	1100	790 (1.6)	48:16:8:6	512	DDR3	64	12.64	32	3.80	7.60	105.600	33
GeForce GT 320	February; 2, 2010	GT215-250-A2	TSMC; 40 nm	727	144	PCIe; 2.0 x16	540	1302	790 (1.6)	72:24:8:9	1024	GDDR3	128	25.28	64	4.32	12.96	187.500	43
GeForce GT 330	February; 2, 2010	GT215-301-A3	TSMC; 40 nm	727	144	PCIe; 2.0 x16	540	1304	790 (1.6)	96:32:8:12	1024	GDDR3	128	25.28	64	4.32	17.28	250.400	75
GeForce GT 330	February; 2, 2010	GT215-301-A3	TSMC; 40 nm	727	144	PCIe; 2.0 x16	550	1340	1000 (2.0)	96:32:8:12	512	GDDR3	128	32.00	64	4.40	17.60	257.300	75
GeForce GT 330	February; 2, 2010	G92	TSMC; 65 nm	754	324	PCIe; 2.0 x16	500	1250	800 (1.6)	96:48:8:12	1024	GDDR3	256	51.20	64	4.00	24.00	240.00	75
GeForce GT 330	February; 2, 2010	G92-168-B1	TSMC; 55 nm	754	260	PCIe; 2.0 x16	500	1250	510 (1.0)	96:48:16:12	256 512; 768 2048	DDR2	128	16.32	32	8.00	24.00	240.00	75
GeForce GT 340	February; 2, 2010	GT215-301-A3	TSMC; 40 nm	727	144	PCIe; 2.0 x16	550	1340	850 (1.7)	96:32:8:12	1024	GDDR3	128	27.20	64	4.40	17.60	257.300	69

=== GeForce 400 series ===
- All models are built on the TSMC 40 nm process and support Vulkan 1.0, OpenGL 4.6, OpenCL 1.1, Direct3D 12 (11_0), & CUDA 2.1 except the GF-210 Cores, which lacks Vulkan (Note: OpenGL 3.3 ES (A subset of OpenGL 4.6) is required for Vulkan 1.0 support) support, supports OpenGL 3.3, Direct3D 11.1 (10_1), & CUDA 1.2 instead, and the GF-100 Cores, which supports CUDA 2.0 instead.

Model	Launch Date	Code Name	Transistors (million)	Die Size (mm^{2})	Bus Interface	Clock Rate			Core Config	Memory Configuration				Cache		Fillrate		Processing Power (GFLOPS)		TDP (Watts)	Power Connectors	MSRP (USD)
Model	Launch Date	Code Name	Transistors (million)	Die Size (mm^{2})	Bus Interface	Core (MHz)	Shader (MHz)	Memory (MHz) (GT/s)	Core Config	Size (MB)	DRAM Type	Bus Width (bit)	Bandwidth (GB/s)	L1 per SM (KB)	L2 (KB)	Pixel (GP/s)	Texture (GT/s)	Single Precision FP32	Double Precision FP64 (1:12)	TDP (Watts)	Power Connectors	MSRP (USD)
GeForce 405	September; 3, 2010	GT218-300-B1	260	57	PCIe; 2.0 x16	589	1402	790 (1.6)	16:8:4:2	512; 1024	DDR3	64	12.64	—N/a	32	2.36	4.71	44.860	—N/a	25	None	OEM
GeForce 405	September; 3, 2010	GT216	486	100	PCIe; 2.0 x16	475	1100	400 (0.8)	24:12:8:3	1024	DDR2	128	12.80	—N/a	32	3.80	5.70	52.800	—N/a	25	None	OEM
GeForce 405	September; 3, 2010	GT216	486	100	PCIe; 2.0 x16	475	1100	800 (1.6)	48:16:8:6	512; 1024	DDR3	64	12.80	—N/a	32	3.80	7.60	105.600	—N/a	25	None	OEM
GeForce GT 415 OEM	September; 3, 2010	GT216-305-A3	486	100	PCIe; 2.0 x16	625	1360	333 (666)	48:16:8:6	512; 1024	DDR3	128	10.66	—N/a	64	5.00	10.00	130.600	—N/a	32	None	OEM
GeForce GT 420 OEM	September; 3, 2010	GF108-200-A1	585	116	PCIe; 2.0 x16	700	1400	900 (1800)	48:4:4:1	1024	DDR3	128	28.80	64	256	2.80		134.400	11.200	50	None	OEM
GeForce GT 430	October; 11, 2010	GF108-300-A1	585	116	PCI	700	1400	600 (1.2)	96:16:4:2	512	DDR3	64	9.60	64	128	2.80	11.20	268.800	22.400	49	None	$79
GeForce GT 430	October; 11, 2010	GF108-300-A1	585	116	PCIe; 2.0 x16	700	1400	800 (1.6)	96:16:4:2	512; 1024	DDR3	64	12.80	64	128	2.80	11.20	268.800	22.400	49	None	$79
GeForce GT 430	October; 11, 2010	GF108-300-A1	585	116	PCIe; 2.0 x16	700	1400	800 (1.6)	96:16:4:2	1024; 2048; 4096	DDR3	128	25.60	64	128	2.80	11.20	268.800	22.400	49	None	$79
GeForce GT 430	October; 11, 2010	GF108-300-A1	585	116	PCIe; 2.0 x16	700	1400	800 (3.2)	96:16:4:2	1024	GDDR5	128	51.20	64	128	2.80	11.20	268.800	22.400	49	None	$79
GeForce GT 430 OEM	October; 11, 2010	GF108-400-A1	585	116	PCIe; 2.0 x16	700	1400	800 (1.6)	96:16:4:2	2048	DDR3	128	25.60	64	256	2.80	11.20	268.800	22.400	49	None	OEM
GeForce GT 440	February; 1, 2011	GF108-400-A1	585	116	PCIe; 2.0 x16	810	1620	900 (1.8)	96:16:4:2	1024; 2048	DDR3	128	28.80	64	256	3.24	12.96	311.000	25.920	65	None	$79
GeForce GT 440	February; 1, 2011	GF108-400-A1	585	116	PCIe; 2.0 x16	810	1620	900 (1.8)	96:16:4:2	256	GDDR3	128	28.80	64	256	3.24	12.96	311.000	25.920	65	None	$79
GeForce GT 440	February; 1, 2011	GF108-400-A1	585	116	PCIe; 2.0 x16	810	1620	900 (3.6)	96:16:4:2	512; 1024	GDDR5	128	57.60	64	256	3.24	12.96	311.000	25.920	65	None	$79
GeForce GT 440 Mac Edition	February; 9, 2011	GF108-400-A1	585	116	PCIe; 1.0 x16	810	1620	667 (1.3)	96:16:4:2	1024	DDR3	128	21.34	64	256	3.24	12.96	311.000	25.920	65	None	OEM
GeForce GT 440 OEM	October; 11, 2010	GF106	1170	238	PCIe; 2.0 x16	810	1620	900 (1.8)	144:24:24:3	1536	DDR3	192	43.20	64	384	19.44		466.600	38.880	65	None	OEM
GeForce GTS 450	September; 13, 2010	GF106-250-KA-A1	1170	238	PCIe; 2.0 x16	783	1566	902 (3.6)	192:32:16:4	1024	GDDR5	128	57.73	64	256	12.53	25.06	601.300	50.110	106	1x 6-Pin	$129
GeForce GTS 450 OEM	September; 13, 2010	GF106	1170	238	PCIe; 2.0 x16	783	1566	902 (3.6)	144:24:16:3	512	GDDR5	128	57.73	64	256	12.53	18.79	451.000	37.580	106	1x 6-Pin	OEM
GeForce GTS 450 OEM	October; 11, 2010	GF106-250-KB-A1	1170	238	PCIe; 2.0 x16	790	1580	1000 (4.0)	144:24:16:3	1536	GDDR5	192	96.00	64	384	12.64	18.96	455.000	37.920	106	1x 6-Pin	OEM
GeForce GTS 450 Rev. 2	March; 15, 2011	GF116-200-KA-A1	1170	238	PCIe; 2.0 x16	783	1566	902 (3.6)	192:32:16:4	1024	GDDR5	128	57.73	64	256	12.53	25.06	601.300	50.110	106	1x 6-Pin	$129
GeForce GTS 450 Rev. 3	July; 11, 2012	GF116-200-KA-A1	1170	238	PCIe; 2.0 x16	783	1566	700 (1.4)	144:24:16:3	1024	DDR3	128	22.40	64	256	12.53	18.79	451.000	37.580	106	2x 6-Pin	$129
GeForce GTX 460 SE	November; 15, 2010	GF104-225-A1	1950	332	PCIe; 2.0 x16	650	1300	850 (3.4)	288:48:32:6	1024	GDDR5	256	108.80	64	512	20.80	31.20	748.800	62.400	150	2x 6-Pin	$160
GeForce GTX 460 SE V2	November; 15, 2010	GF114-400-A1	1950	332	PCIe; 2.0 x16	650	1300	850 (3.4)	288:48:24:6	768	GDDR5	192	81.60	64	384	15.60	31.20	748.800	62.400	150	2x 6-Pin	$160
GeForce GTX 460	July; 12, 2010	GF104-300-KA-A1	1950	332	PCIe; 2.0 x16	675	1350	900 (3.6)	336:56:24:7	768	GDDR5	192	86.40	64	384	16.20	37.80	907.200	75.600	160	2x 6-Pin	$199
GeForce GTX 460	July; 12, 2010	GF104-300-KB-A1	1950	332	PCIe; 2.0 x16	675	1350	900 (3.6)	336:56:24:7	768	GDDR5	192	86.40	64	384	16.20	37.80	907.200	75.600	160	2x 6-Pin	$199
GeForce GTX 460	July; 12, 2010	GF104-325-A1	1950	332	PCIe; 2.0 x16	675	1350	900 (3.6)	336:56:32:7	1024	GDDR5	256	115.20	64	512	21.60	37.80	907.200	75.600	160	2x 6-Pin	$229
GeForce GTX 460 OEM	October; 11, 2010	GF104-325-A1	1950	332	PCIe; 2.0 x16	650	1300	850 (3.4)	336:56:32:7	1024	GDDR5	256	108.80	64	512	20.80	36.40	873.600	72.800	150	2x 6-Pin	OEM
GeForce GTX 460 V2	September; 24, 2011	GF114-400-A1	1950	332	PCIe; 2.0 x16	779	1557	1002 (4.0)	336:56:24:7	1024	GDDR5	192	96.19	64	384	18.70	43.62	1046.300	87.190	160	2x 6-Pin	$199
GeForce GTX 460 V2 E.S.	September; 24, 2011	GF114-400-A1	1950	332	PCIe; 2.0 x16	779	1557	1002 (4.0)	336:56:32:7	1280	GDDR5	256	128.30	64	512	24.93	43.62	1046.300	87.190	160	2x 6-Pin	—N/a
GeForce GTX 460 X2	March; 11, 2011	2x GF104-300-KB-A1	2x 1950	2x 332	PCIe; 2.0 x16	701	1401	900 (3.6)	2x 336:56:32:7	2x 1024	GDDR5	2x 256	2x 115.20	64	2x 512	2x 22.43	2x 39.26	2x 941.500	2x 78.460	160	2x 8-Pin	~$350
GeForce GTX 465	May; 31, 2010	GF100-030-A3	3100	529	PCIe; 2.0 x16	608	1215	802 (3.2)	352:44:32:11	1024	GDDR5	256	102.70	64	512	19.46	26.75	855.4	106.9	200	2x 6-Pin	$279
GeForce GTX 470	March; 26, 2010	GF100-275-A3	3100	529	PCIe; 2.0 x16	608	1215	837 (3.3)	448:56:40:14	1280	GDDR5	320	133.90	64	640	24.32	34.05	1088.600	136.100	215	2x 6-Pin	$349
GeForce GTX 480	March; 26, 2010	GF100-375-A3	3100	529	PCIe; 2.0 x16	701	1401	924 (3.7)	480:60:48:15	1536	GDDR5	384	177.40	64	768	33.65	42.06	1345.000	168.100	250	1x 6-Pin + 1x 8-Pin	$499
Model	Launch Date	Code Name	Transistors (million)	Die Size (mm^{2})	Bus Interface	Core (MHz)	Shader (MHz)	Memory (MHz) (GT/s)	Core Config	Size (MB)	DRAM Type	Bus Width (bit)	Bandwidth (GB/s)	L1 per SM (KB)	L2 (KB)	Pixel (GP/s)	Texture (GT/s)	Single Precision FP32	Double Precision FP64 (1:12)	TDP (Watts)	Power Connectors	MSRP (USD)
Model	Launch Date	Code Name	Transistors (million)	Die Size (mm^{2})	Bus Interface	Clock Rate			Core Config	Memory Configuration				Cache		Fillrate		Processing Power (GFLOPS)		TDP (Watts)	Power Connectors	MSRP (USD)

=== GeForce 500 series ===
- All models are bult on the TSMC 40 nm process and supports Direct3D 12 (11_0), OpenGL 4.6, OpenCL 1.1, & CUDA 2.1 & lacks Vulkan, except for both 505 OEM models which supports Direct3D 11.1 (10_0), OpenGL 3.3, & CUDA 1.2 and the GF 110 Core models which supports CUDA 2.0 instead.

Model	Launch Date	Code Name	Transistors (million)	Die Size (mm^{2})	Bus Interface	Clock Rate			Core Config	Memory Configuration				Cache		Fillrate		Processing Power (GFLOPS)			TDP (Watts)	Power Connectors	MSRP (USD)
Model	Launch Date	Code Name	Transistors (million)	Die Size (mm^{2})	Bus Interface	Core (MHz)	Shader (MHz)	Memory (MHz) (GT/s)	Core Config	Size (MB)	DRAM Type	Bus Width (bit)	Bandwidth (GB/s)	L1 per SM (KB)	L2 (KB)	Pixel (GP/s)	Texture (GT/s)	Single Precision FP32	Double Precision FP64 (1:12)	Double Precision FP64 (1:8)	TDP (Watts)	Power Connectors	MSRP (USD)
GeForce 505 OEM	January; 6, 2013	GT218-300-B1	260	57	PCIe; 1.0 x16	589	1402	600 (1.2)	16:8:4:2	512; 1024	DDR3	64	9.60	—N/a	32	2.36	4.71	44.864	—N/a		25	None	OEM
GeForce 505 OEM	February; 17, 2013	GT216	486	100	PCIe; 1.0 x16	615	1031	700 (1.4)	24:12:8:3	1024	DDR3	128	22.40	—N/a	64	4.92	7.38	49.488	—N/a		25	None	OEM
GeForce 510 OEM	September; 29, 2011	GF119S	292	79	PCIe; 2.0 x16	523	1046	898 (1.8)	48:8:4:1	1024; 2048	DDR3	64	14.37	64	128	2.09	4.18	100.416	8.368	—N/a	25	None	OEM
GeForce GT 520	April; 13, 2011	GF119-300-A1	292	79	PCI	810	1620	900 (1.8)	48:8:4:1	1024	DDR3	64	14.40	64	128	3.24	6.48	155.520	12.960	—N/a	29	None	$59
GeForce GT 520	April; 13, 2011	GF119-300-A1	292	79	PCIe; 2.0 x16	810	1620	900 (1.8)	48:8:4:1	1024	DDR3	64	14.40	64	128	3.24	6.48	155.520	12.960	—N/a	29	None	$59
GeForce GT 520	April; 13, 2011	GF119-300-A1	292	79	PCIe; 2.0 x1	810	1620	900 (1.8)	48:8:4:1	1024; 2048	DDR3	64	14.40	64	128	3.24	6.48	155.520	12.960	—N/a	29	None	$59
GeForce GT 520 OEM	August; 20, 2012	GF119S	292	79	PCIe; 2.0 x16	589	1402	500 (1.0)	48:8:4:2	1024	DDR3	64	8.00	64	128	2.36	4.71	134.592	11.216	—N/a	29	None	OEM
GeForce GT 520 OEM	February; 1, 2012	GF108-200-A1	585	116	PCIe; 2.0 x16	700	1400	667 (1.3)	48:8:4:1	1024; 2048	DDR3	64	10.67	64	128	2.80	5.60	134.400	11.200	—N/a	29	None	OEM
GeForce GT 530 OEM	May; 14, 2011	GF108-200-A1	585	116	PCIe; 2.0 x16	700	1400	900 (1.8)	96:16:4:2	1024; 2048	DDR3	128	28.80	64	256	2.80	11.20	268.800	22.400	—N/a	50	None	OEM
GeForce GT 545	May; 14, 2011	GF116	1170	238	PCIe; 2.0 x16	720	1440	800 (1.6)	144:24:16:3	1536; 3072	DDR3	192	38.40	64	384	11.52	17.28	414.720	34.560	—N/a	70	None	$149
GeForce GT 545 OEM	May; 14, 2011	GF116-110-KA-A1	1170	238	PCIe; 2.0 x16	871	1741	1000 (4.0)	144:24:16:3	1024	GDDR5	128	64.00	64	256	13.94	20.90	501.408	41.784	—N/a	105	1x 6-Pin	OEM
GeForce GTX 550 Ti	March; 15, 2011	GF116-400-A1	1170	238	PCIe; 2.0 x16	900	1800	1026 (4.1)	192:32:24:4	1024	GDDR5	192 (Note: 1024 MB on a 192-bit bus split as 4x (128 MB) + 2x (256 MB).)	98.50	64	384	21.60	28.80	691.200	57.600	—N/a	116	1x 6-Pin	$149
GeForce GTX 555 OEM	May; 14, 2011	GF114-200-KB-A1	1950	332	PCIe; 2.0 x16	736	1472	957 (3.8)	288:48:24:6	1024	GDDR5	192	91.87	64	384	17.66	35.33	847.872	70.656	—N/a	150	2x 6-Pin	OEM
GeForce GTX 560 SE	February; 20, 2012	GF114-200-KB-A1	1950	332	PCIe; 2.0 x16	736	1472	957 (3.8)	288:48:24:6	1024	GDDR5	192	91.87	64	384	17.66	35.33	847.872	70.656	—N/a	150	2x 6-Pin	$149
GeForce GTX 560	May; 17, 2011	GF114-325-A1	1950	332	PCIe; 2.0 x16	810	1620	1000 (4.0)	336:56:32:7	1024	GDDR5	256	128.00	64	512	25.92	45.36	1088.640	90.720	—N/a	150	2x 6-Pin	$199
GeForce GTX 560 OEM	November; 29, 2011	GF110-040-A1	3000	520	PCIe; 2.0 x16	552	1104	802 (3.2)	384:48:40:12	1280	GDDR5	320	128.30	64	640	22.08	26.50	847.872	—N/a	105.984	150	1x 6-Pin	OEM
GeForce GTX 560 Ti	January; 25, 2011	GF114-400-A1	1950	332	PCIe; 2.0 x16	823	1645	1002 (4.0)	384:64:32:8	1024	GDDR5	256	128.30	64	512	26.34	52.67	1236.360	105.280	—N/a	170	2x 6-Pin	$249
GeForce GTX 560 Ti OEM	March; 8, 2011	GF114-400-A1	1950	332	PCIe; 2.0 x16	823	1645	1002 (4.0)	384:64:32:8	1024	GDDR5	256	128.30	64	512	26.34	52.67	1236.360	105.280	—N/a	170	2x 6-Pin	OEM
GeForce GTX 560 Ti OEM	March; 30, 2011	GF110	3000	520	PCIe; 2.0 x16	732	1464	950 (3.8)	352:44:40:11	1280	GDDR5	256	128.80	64	512	29.28	32.21	1030.656	—N/a	128.832	210	2x 6-Pin	OEM
GeForce GTX 560 Ti 448	November; 29, 2011	GF110-270-A1	3000	520	PCIe; 2.0 x16	732	1464	950 (3.8)	448:56:40:14	1280	GDDR5	320	152.00	64	640	29.28	40.99	1311.744	—N/a	163.968	210	2x 6-Pin	$289
GeForce GTX 560 Ti X2	January; 25, 2011	2x GF114-400-A1	2x 1950	2x 332	PCIe; 2.0 x16	850	1700	1002 (4.0)	2x 384:64:32:8	2x 1024	GDDR5	2x 256	2x 128.30	64	2x 512	2x 27.20	2x 54.40	2x 1305.600	2x 108.800	—N/a	170	2x 8-Pin	$519
GeForce GTX 570	December; 7, 2010	GF110-275-A1	3000	520	PCIe; 2.0 x16	732	1464	950 (3.8)	480:60:40:15	1280	GDDR5	320	152.00	64	640	29.28	43.92	1405.440	—N/a	175.680	219	2x 6-Pin	$349
GeForce GTX 570 Rev. 2	December; 7, 2010	GF110-275-A1	3000	520	PCIe; 2.0 x16	732	1464	950 (3.8)	480:60:40:15	1280	GDDR5	320	152.00	64	640	29.28	43.92	1405.440	—N/a	175.680	219	2x 6-Pin	$349
GeForce GTX 580	November; 9, 2010	GF110-375-A1	3000	520	PCIe; 2.0 x16	772	1544	1002 (4.0)	512:64:48:16	1536	GDDR5	384	192.40	64	768	37.06	49.41	1581.056	—N/a	197.632	244	1x 6-Pin + 1x 8-Pin	$499
GeForce GTX 580 Rev. 2	June; 6, 2011	GF110-380-A1	3000	520	PCIe; 2.0 x16	772	1544	1002 (4.0)	512:64:48:16	1536	GDDR5	384	192.40	64	768	37.06	49.41	1581.056	—N/a	197.632	244	1x 6-Pin + 1x 8-Pin	$499
GeForce GTX 590	March; 24, 2011	2x GF110-351-A1	2x 3000	2x 520	PCIe; 2.0 x16	608	1215	854 (3.4)	2x 512:64:48:16	2x 1536	GDDR5	2x 384	2x 164.00	64	2x 768	2x 29.18	2x 38.91	2x 1244.160	—N/a	2x 155.520	365	2x 2x 8-Pin	$699
Model	Launch Date	Code Name	Transistors (million)	Die Size (mm^{2})	Bus Interface	Core (MHz)	Shader (MHz)	Memory (MHz) (GT/s)	Core Config	Size (MB)	DRAM Type	Bus Width (bit)	Bandwidth (GB/s)	L1 per SM (KB)	L2 (KB)	Pixel (GP/s)	Texture (GT/s)	Single Precision FP32	Double Precision FP64 (1:12)	Double Precision FP64 (1:8)	TDP (Watts)	Power Connectors	MSRP (USD)
Model	Launch Date	Code Name	Transistors (million)	Die Size (mm^{2})	Bus Interface	Clock Rate			Core Config	Memory Configuration				Cache		Fillrate		Processing Power (GFLOPS)			TDP (Watts)	Power Connectors	MSRP (USD)

=== GeForce 600 series ===
- All models support Direct3D 12 (11_0) & OpenGL 4.6.
- All GF core models support OpenCL 1.1 & CUDA 2.1
- All GK core models support OpenCL 3.0 & Vulkan 1.2.175.
- All GK100 core models support CUDA 3.0.
- All GK200 core models support CUDA 3.5.

Model	Launch Date	Code Name	Fab (nm)	Transistors (million)	Die Size (mm^{2})	Bus Interface	Clock Rate			Core Config	Memory Configuration				Cache		Fillrate		Processing Power (GFLOPS)			TDP (Watts)	Power Connectors	MSRP (USD)
Model	Launch Date	Code Name	Fab (nm)	Transistors (million)	Die Size (mm^{2})	Bus Interface	Core (MHz) (Boost)	Shader (MHz) (Boost)	Memory (MHz) (GT/s)	Core Config	Size (MB)	DRAM Type	Bus Width (bit)	Bandwidth (GB/s)	L1 per SM(X) (KB)	L2 (KB)	Pixel (GP/s)	Texture (GT/s)	Single Precision FP32	Double Precision FP64 (1:12)	Double Precision FP64 (1:24)	TDP (Watts)	Power Connectors	MSRP (USD)
GeForce 605 OEM	April; 2, 2012	GF119-200-A1	TSMC; 40 nm	292	79	PCIe; 2.0 x16	523	1046	897 (1.8)	48:8:4:1	512; 1024	DDR3	64	14.35	64	128	2.09	4.18	100.416	8.368	—N/a	25	None	OEM
GeForce GT 610	April; 2, 2012	GF119-300-A1	TSMC; 40 nm	292	79	PCI	810	1620	667 (1.3)	48:8:4:1	512	DDR3	64	10.67	64	128	3.24	6.48	155.520	12.960	—N/a	29	None	$49
GeForce GT 610	April; 2, 2012	GF119-300-A1	TSMC; 40 nm	292	79	PCIe; 2.0 x1	810	1620	500 (1.0)	48:8:4:1	512	DDR3	64	8.00	64	128	3.24	6.48	155.520	12.960	—N/a	29	None	$49
GeForce GT 610	April; 2, 2012	GF119-300-A1	TSMC; 40 nm	292	79	PCIe; 2.0 x16	810	1620	898 (1.8)	48:8:4:1	1024	DDR3	64	14.37	64	128	3.24	6.48	155.520	12.960	—N/a	29	None	$49
GeForce GT 610 OEM	September; 9, 2012	GF119S	TSMC; 40 nm	292	79	PCIe; 2.0 x16	550	1200	500 (1.0)	48:8:4:2	1024	DDR3	64	8.00	64	128	2.20	4.40	115.200	9.600	—N/a	29	None	OEM
GeForce GT 610 OEM	April; 2, 2016	GF108	TSMC; 40 nm	585	116	PCIe; 2.0 x16	701	1402	500 (1.0)	48:8:4:1	2048	DDR3	64	8.00	64	128	2.80	5.60	134.592	11.216	—N/a	29	None	OEM
GeForce 615 OEM	May; 15, 2012	GF108	TSMC; 40 nm	585	116	PCIe; 2.0 x16	660	1320	900 (1.8)	48:8:4:1	1024	DDR3	128	28.80	64	256	2.64	5.28	126.720	10.560	—N/a	49	None	OEM
GeForce GT 620	May; 15, 2012	GF108-100-KB-A1	TSMC; 40 nm	585	116	PCIe; 2.0 x16	700	1400	900 (1.8)	96:16:4:2	1024	DDR3	64	14.40	64	128	2.80	11.20	268.800	22.400	—N/a	49	None	$59
GeForce GT 620 OEM	April; 2, 2012	GF119S	TSMC; 40 nm	292	79	PCIe; 2.0 x16	810	1620	898 (1.8)	48:8:4:1	512; 1024	DDR3	64	14.37	64	128	3.24	6.48	155.520	12.960	—N/a	30	None	OEM
GeForce GT 625 OEM	February; 18, 2013	GF119-400-A1	TSMC; 40 nm	292	79	PCIe; 2.0 x16	874	1748	825 (1.7)	48:8:4:1	1024	DDR3	64	13.20	64	128	3.50	6.99	167.808	13.984	—N/a	29	None	OEM
GeForce GT 630	May; 15, 2012	GF108-400-A1	TSMC; 40 nm	585	116	PCIe; 2.0 x16	810	1620	900 (1.8)	96:16:4:2	1024	DDR3	128	28.80	64	256	3.24	12.96	311.040	25.920	—N/a	65	None	$79
GeForce GT 630 Rev. 2	May; 29, 2013	GK208-301-A1	TSMC; 28 nm	1020	87	PCIe; 2.0 x8	902		900 (1.8)	384:32:8:2	2048	DDR3	64	14.40	16	512	7.22	28.86	692.736	—N/a	28.864	25	None	$79
GeForce GT 630 OEM	April; 24, 2012	GK107-301-A2	TSMC; 28 nm	1270	118	PCIe; 3.0 x16	875		891 (1.8)	192:16:16:1	1024; 2048	DDR3	128	28.51	16	256	14.00		336.000	—N/a	14.000	50	None	OEM
GeForce GT 635 OEM	October; 1, 2013	GK208	TSMC; 28 nm	1020	87	PCIe; 3.0 x8	967		900 (1.8)	384:32:8:2	1024	DDR3	64	14.40	16	512	7.74	30.94	742.656	—N/a	30.944	35	None	OEM
GeForce GT 640	June; 5, 2012	GK107-300-A2	TSMC; 28 nm	1270	118	PCIe; 3.0 x16	902		891 (1.8)	384:32:16:2	2048	DDR3	128	28.51	16	256	7.22	28.86	692.736	—N/a	28.864	65	None	$99
GeForce GT 640 Rev. 2	May; 29, 2013	GK208-400-A1	TSMC; 28 nm	1020	87	PCIe; 2.0 x8	1046		1252 (5.0)	384:32:8:2	1024	GDDR5	64	40.06	16	512	16.74	33.47	803.328	—N/a	33.472	49	None	$89
GeForce GT 640 OEM	April; 24, 2012	GK107-320-A2	TSMC; 28 nm	1270	118	PCIe; 3.0 x16	797		891 (1.8)	384:32:16:2	2048; 4096	DDR3	128	28.51	16	256	12.75	25.50	612.096	—N/a	25.504	50	None	OEM
GeForce GT 640 OEM	April; 24, 2012	GK107-320-A2	TSMC; 28 nm	1270	118	PCIe; 3.0 x16	797		891 (3.6)	384:32:16:2	1024	GDDR5	128	57.02	16	256	12.75	25.50	612.096	—N/a	25.504	50	None	OEM
GeForce GT 640 OEM Rebrand	April; 24, 2012	GF116-150-A1	TSMC; 40 nm	1170	238	PCIe; 2.0 x16	720	1440	800 (1.6)	144:24:24:3	1536	DDR3	192	38.40	64	384	17.28		414.720	34.560	—N/a	75	None	OEM
GeForce GT 645 OEM	April; 24, 2012	GF114	TSMC; 40 nm	1950	332	PCIe; 2.0 x16	776	1552	957 (3.8)	288:48:24:6	1024 (Note: 1024 MB on a 192-bit bus split as 4x (128 MB) + 2x (256 MB) or 2048 MB on a 192-bit bus split as 8x (128 MB) + 4x (256 MB).); 1536	GDDR5	192	91.87	64	384	18.62	37.25	893.952	74.496	—N/a	102	1x 6-Pin	OEM
GeForce GTX 645 OEM	April; 22, 2013	GK106-200-A1	TSMC; 28 nm	2540	221	PCIe; 3.0 x16	824		1000 (4.0)	576:48:16:3	1024	GDDR5	128	64.00	16	256	13.18	39.55	949.248	—N/a	39.552	65	None	OEM
GeForce GTX 650	September; 6, 2012	GK107-450-A2	TSMC; 28 nm	1270	118	PCIe; 3.0 x16	1058		1250 (5.0)	384:32:16:2	1024	GDDR5	128	80.00	16	256	16.93	33.86	812.554	—N/a	33.856	65	1x 6-Pin	$109
GeForce GTX 650	November; 27, 2013	GK106	TSMC; 28 nm	2540	221	PCIe; 3.0 x16	1058		1250 (5.0)	384:32:16:2	1024	GDDR5	128	80.00	16	256	16.93	33.86	812.554	—N/a	33.856	65	1x 6-Pin	$109
GeForce GTX 650 Ti	October; 9, 2012	GK106-220-A1	TSMC; 28 nm	2540	221	PCIe; 3.0 x16	928		1350 (5.4)	768:64:16:4	1024	GDDR5	128	86.40	16	256	14.85	59.39	1,425.408	—N/a	59.392	110	1x 6-Pin	$149
GeForce GTX 650 Ti OEM	March; 31, 2013	GK106	TSMC; 28 nm	2540	221	PCIe; 3.0 x16	928		1350 (5.4)	768:64:16:4	2048	GDDR5	128	86.40	16	256	14.85	59.39	1,425.408	—N/a	59.392	110	1x 6-Pin	OEM
GeForce GTX 650 Ti Boost	March; 26, 2013	GK106-240-A1	TSMC; 28 nm	2540	221	PCIe; 3.0 x16	980 (1032)		1502 (6.0)	768:64:24:4	2048	GDDR5	192	144.20	16	384	23.52 (24.77)	62.72 (66.05)	1,505.280 (1,585.152)	—N/a	62.720 (66.048)	134	1x 6-Pin	$169
GeForce GTX 660	September; 6, 2012	GK106-400-A1	TSMC; 28 nm	2540	221	PCIe; 3.0 x16	980 (1032)		1502 (6.0)	960:80:24:5	2048	GDDR5	192	144.20	16	384	23.52 (24.77)	62.72 (66.05)	1,505.280 (1,585.152)	—N/a	62.720 (66.048)	140	1x 6-Pin	$229
GeForce GTX 660 Rev. 2	September; 13, 2014	GK104	TSMC; 28 nm	3540	294	PCIe; 3.0 x16	980 (1032)		1502 (6.0)	960:80:24:5	2048	GDDR5	192	144.20	16	384	23.52 (24.77)	62.72 (66.05)	1,505.280 (1,585.152)	—N/a	62.720 (66.048)	140	1x 6-Pin	$229
GeForce GTX 660 OEM	August; 22, 2012	GK104-200-KD-A2	TSMC; 28 nm	3540	294	PCIe; 3.0 x16	823 (888)		1400 (5.6)	1152:96:24:6	1536; 3072	GDDR5	192	134.40	16	384	19.75 (21.31)	79.01 (88.25)	1,896.192 (2,045.952)	—N/a	79.008 (85.248)	130	1x 6-Pin	OEM
GeForce GTX 660 OEM	August; 22, 2012	GK104-200-KD-A2	TSMC; 28 nm	3540	294	PCIe; 3.0 x16	823 (888)		1400 (5.6)	1152:96:24:6	2048	GDDR5	256	179.20	16	512	19.75 (21.31)	79.01 (88.25)	1,896.192 (2,045.952)	—N/a	79.008 (85.248)	130	1x 6-Pin	OEM
GeForce GTX 660 Ti	August; 16, 2012	GK104-300-KD-A2	TSMC; 28 nm	3540	294	PCIe; 3.0 x16	915 (980)		1502 (6.0)	1344:112:24:7	2048	GDDR5	192	144.20	16	384	21.96 (23.52)	102.48 (109.76)	2,459.520 (2,634.240)	—N/a	102.480 (109.760)	150	2x 6-Pin	$299
GeForce GTX 670	May; 10, 2012	GK104-325-A2	TSMC; 28 nm	3540	294	PCIe; 3.0 x16	915 (980)		1502 (6.0)	1344:112:32:7	2048	GDDR5	256	192.30	16	512	29.28 (31.36)	102.48 (109.76)	2,459.520 (2,634.240)	—N/a	102.480 (109.760)	170	2x 6-Pin	$399
GeForce GTX 680	March; 22, 2012	GK104-400-A2	TSMC; 28 nm	3540	294	PCIe; 3.0 x16	1006 (1058)		1502 (6.0)	1536:128:32:8	2048	GDDR5	256	192.30	16	512	32.19 (33.86)	128.77 (135.42)	3090.432 (3,250.176)	—N/a	128.768 (135.424)	195	2x 6-Pin	$499
GeForce GTX 680 Mac Edition (Note: When used on MacOS, only OpenGL 3.2 is supported, instead of 4.6 when used on Windows.)	April; 3, 2013	GK104-400-A2	TSMC; 28 nm	3540	294	PCIe; 2.0 x16	1006 (1058)		1502 (6.0)	1536:128:32:8	2048	GDDR5	256	192.30	16	512	32.19 (33.86)	128.77 (135.42)	3090.432 (3,250.176)	—N/a	128.768 (135.424)	195	2x 6-Pin	OEM
GeForce GTX 690	May; 3, 2012	2x GK104-355-A2	TSMC; 28 nm	2x 2540	2x 294	PCIe; 3.0 x16	915 (1019)		1502 (6.0)	2x 1536:128:32:8	2x 2048	GDDR5	2x 256	2x 192.30	16	2x 512	2x 29.280; 2x (32.608)	2x 117.12; 2x (130.43)	2x 2,810.880; 2x (3,130.368)	—N/a	2x 117.120; 2x (130.432)	300	2x 8-Pin	$999
Model	Launch Date	Code Name	Fab (nm)	Transistors (million)	Die Size (mm^{2})	Bus Interface	Core (MHz) (Boost)	Shader (MHz) (Boost)	Memory (MHz) (GT/s)	Core Config	Size (MB)	DRAM Type	Bus Width (bit)	Bandwidth (GB/s)	L1 per SM(X) (KB)	L2 (KB)	Pixel (GP/s)	Texture (GT/s)	Single Precision FP32	Double Precision FP64 (1:12)	Double Precision FP64 (1:24)	TDP (Watts)	Power Connectors	MSRP (USD)
Model	Launch Date	Code Name	Fab (nm)	Transistors (million)	Die Size (mm^{2})	Bus Interface	Clock Rate			Core Config	Memory Configuration				Cache		Fillrate		Processing Power (GFLOPS)			TDP (Watts)	Power Connectors	MSRP (USD)

=== GeForce 700 series ===
- All GM107-chips are Maxwell-based, all GF1xx are Fermi-based, and all GKxxx-chips are Kepler-based.
- Many models are rebranded cards from previous generations.
- API Support:
  - All models support Direct3D 12 (11_0). OpenGL 4.6.
  - Vulkan: Maxwell chips support 1.3, Kepler chips support 1.2, & Fermi lacks support.
  - OpenCL: Maxwell and Kepler chips support 3.0, while Fermi chips only support 1.1.
- GTX TITAN class cards use Double precision 1:3 instead of 1:24 or 1:32 found on other GTX 700 series cards.

Model	Launch Date	Code Name	Fab (nm)	Transistors (million)	Die Size (mm^{2})	Bus Interface	Clock Rate			Core Config	Memory Configuration				Cache		Fillrate		Processing Power (GFLOPS)		TDP (Watts)	Power Connectors	MSRP (USD)
Model	Launch Date	Code Name	Fab (nm)	Transistors (million)	Die Size (mm^{2})	Bus Interface	Core (Boost) (MHz)	Shader (Boost) (MHz)	Memory (MHz) (MT/s)	Core Config	Size (GB)	DRAM Type	Bus Width (bit)	Bandwidth (GB/s)	L1 per SM(X)/(M) (KB)	L2 (KB)	Pixel (GP/s)	Texture (GT/s)	Single Precision	Double Precision	TDP (Watts)	Power Connectors	MSRP (USD)
GeForce GT 705 OEM	March; 27, 2014	GF119-400-A1	TSMC; 40 nm	292	79	PCIe 2x16	874	1748	825 (1650)	48:8:4:1	1	DDR3	64	13.2	64	128	1.748	6.992	167.8	13.98	29	None	OEM
GeForce GT 710 OEM	March; 27, 2014	GK208B	TSMC; 28HP	1020	87	PCIe 2x8	797		900 (1800)	192:16:8:1	1	DDR3	64	14.4	16	512	3.188	12.75	306.0	12.75	?	None	OEM
GeForce GT 710	March; 27, 2014	GK208-203-B1	TSMC; 28HP	1020	87	PCIe 2x1	954		800 (1600)	192:16:8:1	1	DDR3	64	12.8	16	512	3.816	15.26	366.3	15.26	19	None	$35
GeForce GT 710	March; 27, 2014	GK208-203-B1	TSMC; 28HP	1020	87	PCIe 2x8	954		900 (1800)	192:16:8:1	2	DDR3	64	14.4	16	512	3.816	15.26	366.3	15.26	19	None	$35
GeForce GT 710	January; 26, 2016	GF119-300-A1	TSMC; 40 nm	292	79	PCIe 2x16	810	1620	898 (1796)	48:8:4:1	1	DDR3	64	14.37	64	128	1.62	6.48	155.5	12.96	29	None	$35
GeForce GT 720 OEM	October; 29, 2017	GK107	TSMC; 28HP	1270	118	PCIe 3x16	993		891 (1782)	192:16:16:1	1	DDR3	128	28.51	16	256	3.972	15.89	381.3	15.89	50	None	OEM
GeForce GT 720	September; 29, 2014	GK208B	TSMC; 28HP	1020	87	PCIe 2x8	797		800 (1600)	192:16:8:1	1	DDR3	64	12.8	16	512	3.188	12.75	306.0	12.75	19	None	$49
GeForce GT 730 OEM	April; 9, 2015	GK107	TSMC; 28HP	1270	118	PCIe 3x16	902		1253 (5012)	384:32:8:2	1	GDDR5	64	40.1	16	128	7.216	28.86	692.7	28.9	64	1x 6-Pin	OEM
GeForce GT 730	June; 18, 2014	GK208-302-B1	TSMC; 28HP	1020	87	PCIe 2x8	902		1253 (5012)	384:32:8:2	1	GDDR5	64	40.1	16	512	7.216	28.86	692.7	28.9	38	None	$69
GeForce GT 730	June; 18, 2014	GF108-400-A1	TSMC; 40 nm	585	116	PCIe 2x16	700	1400	900 (1800)	96:16:4:2	1	DDR3	128	28.8	64	256	2.8	11.2	268.8	22.4	49	None	$69
GeForce GT 730	June; 18, 2014	GF108-400-A1	TSMC; 40 nm	585	116	PCIe 2x16	700	1400	800 (1600)	96:16:4:2	2	DDR3	128	25.6	64	256	2.8	11.2	268.8	22.4	49	None	$69
GeForce GT 740 OEM	April; 14 2015	GK106S	TSMC; 28HP	2540	221	PCIe 3x16	1006		1253 (5012)	384:32:16:2	1	GDDR5	128	80.19	64	256	8.084	32.19	772.6	32.19	65	None	OEM
GeForce GT 740 OEM	April; 14 2015	GK106S	TSMC; 28HP	2540	221	PCIe 3x16	980 (1033)		1253 (5012)	384:32:16:2	1	GDDR5	128	80.19	64	256	7.84 (8.264)	31.36 (33.06)	752.6 (793.3)	31.36 (33.06)	65	None	OEM
GeForce GT 740	May; 29, 2014	GK107-425-A2	TSMC; 28HP	1270	118	PCIe 3x16	993		1253 (5012)	384:32:16:2	1	GDDR5	128	80.19	16	256	7.99	31.78	762.6	31.78	64	1x 6-Pin	$89
GeForce GTX 745 OEM	February; 18, 2014	GM107-220-A2	TSMC; 28HP	1870	148	PCIe 3x16	1033		900 (1800)	384:24:16:3	4	DDR3	128	28.8	64	2048	16.53	24.79	793.3	24.79	55	None	OEM
GeForce GTX 750	February; 18, 2014	GM107-300-A2	TSMC; 28HP	1870	148	PCIe 3x16	1020 (1085)		1253 (5012)	512:32:16:4	1	GDDR5	128	80.19	64	2048	16.32 (17.36)	32.64 (34.72)	1,044.4 (1,111.0)	32.64 (34.72)	55	None	$119
GeForce GTX 750	November; 17, 2015	GM206	TSMC; 28HP	2940	228	PCIe 3x16	1087 (1239)		1253 (5012)	512:32:32:4	2	GDDR5	128	80.19	48	1024	34.79 (39.65)	34.79 (39.65)	1,113.1 (1,268.7)	34.79 (39.65)	60	None	$149
GeForce GTX 750 Ti OEM	February; 18, 2014	GK106	TSMC; 28HP	2540	221	PCIe 3x16	1033 (1098)		1502 (6008)	960:80:24:5	2	GDDR5	256	192.3	16	512	20.66 (21.96)	82.64 (87.84)	1,983.2 (2,108.2)	82.64 (87.84)	60	None	OEM
GeForce GTX 750 Ti	February; 18, 2014	GM107-400-A2	TSMC; 28HP	1870	148	PCIe 3x16	1020 (1085)		1350 (5400)	640:40:16:5	2	GDDR5	128	86.4	64	2048	16.32 (17.36)	40.8 (43.4)	1,305.6 (1,388.8)	40.8 (43.4)	60	None	$149
GeForce GTX 760 OEM	June; 27, 2013	GK104-200-KD-A2	TSMC; 28HP	3540	294	PCIe 3x16	823 (888)		1400 (5600)	1152:96:24:6	1.5	GDDR5	192	134.4	16	384	19.75 (21.31)	79 (85.25)	1,896.2 (2,046.0)	79 (85.25)	130	1x 6-Pin	OEM
GeForce GTX 760 OEM (Rebrand)	August; 25, 2013	GK104-200-KD-A2	TSMC; 28HP	3540	294	PCIe 3x16	823 (888)		1400 (5600)	1152:96:32:6	1.5	GDDR5	256	179.2	16	512	26.34 (28.42)	79 (85.25)	1,896.2 (2,046.0)	79 (85.25)	130	1x 6-Pin	OEM
GeForce GTX 760 OEM (Core 1344)	November; 6, 2016	GK104-200-KD-A2	TSMC; 28HP	3540	294	PCIe 3x16	993 (1046)		1650 (6600)	1344:112:32:7	2	GDDR5	256	211.2	16	512	27.81 (29.29)	111.26 (117.2)	2,669.5 (2,811.6)	111.26 (117.2)	170	2x 6-Pin	OEM
GeForce GTX 760	June; 25, 2013	GK104-225-A2	TSMC; 28HP	3540	294	PCIe 3x16	980 (1032)		1502 (6008)	1152:96:32:6	2	GDDR5	256	192.3	16	512	31.36; 33.02)	94.08 (99.07)	2,258.2 (2,377.7)	94.08 (99.07)	170	2x 6-Pin	$219
GeForce GTX 760 X2	November; 19 2013	2x GK104-225-A2	TSMC; 28HP	2x 3540	2x 294	PCIe 3x16	1006 (1072)		1502 (6008)	2x 1152:96:32:6	2x 2	GDDR5	2x 256	2x 192.3	2x 16	2x 512	64.38 (68.61)	225.34 (240.13)	4,635.6 (4,939.8)	225.34 (240.13)	250	2x 8-Pin	~$600
GeForce GTX 760 Ti OEM	September; 27, 2013	GK104-325-A2	TSMC; 28HP	3540	294	PCIe 3x16	915 (980)		1502 (6008)	1344:112:32:7	2	GDDR5	256	192.3	16	512	29.28 (31.36)	102.48 (109.76)	2,459.5 (2,634.2)	102.48 (109.76)	170	2x 6-Pin	OEM
GeForce GTX 760 Ti OEM (Rebrand)	September; 27, 2013	GK104-325-A2	TSMC; 28HP	3540	294	PCIe 3x16	915 (980)		1502 (6008)	1344:112:32:7	2	GDDR5	256	192.3	16	512	29.28 (31.36)	102.48 (109.76)	2,459.5 (2,634.2)	102.48 (109.76)	170	2x 6-Pin	OEM
GeForce GTX 770	May; 30, 2013	GK104-425-A2	TSMC; 28HP	3540	294	PCIe 3x16	1046 (1085)		1753 (7012)	1536:128:32:8	2	GDDR5	256	224.4	16	512	33.47 (34.72)	133.89 (138.88)	3,213.2 (3,333.1)	133.89 (138.88)	230	1x 6-Pin + 1x 8-Pin	$329
GeForce GTX 780	May; 23, 2013	GK110-300-A1	TSMC; 28HP	7080	561	PCIe 3x16	863 (902)		1502 (6008)	2304:192:48:12	3	GDDR5	384	288.4	16	1536	41.42 (43.30)	165.70 (173.18)	3,976.7 (4,156.4)	165.70 (173.18)	250	1x 6-Pin + 1x 8-Pin	$649
GeForce GTX 780 Rev. 2	September; 10, 2013	GK110-300-B1 (Note: The bios was completely reworked from the ground up.)	TSMC; 28HP	7080	561	PCIe 3x16	863 (902)		1502 (6008)	2304:192:48:12	3	GDDR5	384	288.4	16	1536	41.42 (43.30)	165.70 (173.18)	3,976.7 (4,156.4)	165.70 (173.18)	250	1x 6-Pin + 1x 8-Pin	$649
GeForce GTX 780 Rev. 2	September; 10, 2013	GK110-301-B1	TSMC; 28HP	7080	561	PCIe 3x16	863 (902)		1502 (6008)	2304:192:48:12	6	GDDR5	384	288.4	16	1536	41.42 (43.30)	165.70 (173.18)	3,976.7 (4,156.4)	165.70 (173.18)	250	1x 6-Pin + 1x 8-Pin	$549
GeForce GTX 780 Ti	November; 7, 2013	GK110-425-B1	TSMC; 28HP	7080	561	PCIe 3x16	875 (928)		1753 (7012)	2880:240:48:15	3	GDDR5	384	336.6	16	1536	42.0 (44.54)	210.0 (222.72)	5,040.0 (5,345.3)	210.0 (222.72)	250	1x 6-Pin + 1x 8-Pin	$699
GeForce GTX TITAN	February; 21, 2013	GK110-400-A1	TSMC; 28HP	7080	561	PCIe 3x16	836 (876)		1502 (6008)	2688:224:48:14	6	GDDR5	384	288.4	16	1536	40.13 (42.05)	187.26 (196.224)	4,494.3 (4,709.4)	1498.11 (1569.79)	250	1x 6-Pin + 1x 8-Pin	$999
GeForce GTX TITAN Black	February; 18, 2014	GK110-430-B1	TSMC; 28HP	7080	561	PCIe 3x16	889 (980)		1750 (7000)	2880:240:48:15	6	GDDR5	384	336	16	1536	42.67 (47.04)	213.36 (235.20)	5,120.6 (5,644.8)	1706.88 (1881.6)	250	1x 6-Pin + 1x 8-Pin	$999
GeForce GTX TITAN Z	May; 28, 2014	2× GK110-350-B1	TSMC; 28HP	2x 7080	2x 561	PCIe 3x16	705 (876)		1750 (7000)	2x 2880:240:48:15	2× 6	GDDR5	2× 384	2× 336	2x 16	2x 1536	67.68 (84.10)	338.40 (420.48)	8,121.6 (10,091.5)	2,707.20 (3,363.84)	375	2x 8-Pin	$2999
Model	Launch Date	Code Name	Fab (nm)	Transistors (million)	Die Size (mm^{2})	Bus Interface	Core (Boost) (MHz)	Shader (Boost) (MHz)	Memory (MHz) (MT/s)	Core Config	Size (GB)	DRAM Type	Bus Width (bit)	Bandwidth (GB/s)	L1 per SM(X)/(M) (KB)	L2 (KB)	Pixel (GP/s)	Texture (GT/s)	Single Precision	Double Precision	TDP (Watts)	Power Connectors	MSRP USD
Model	Launch Date	Code Name	Fab (nm)	Transistors (million)	Die Size (mm^{2})	Bus Interface	Clock Rate			Core Config	Memory Configuration				Cache		Fillrate		Processing Power (GFLOPS)		TDP (Watts)	Power Connectors	MSRP USD

=== GeForce 900 series ===
- All models support Direct3D 12 (12_1), OpenGL 4.6, OpenCL 3.0, and Vulkan 1.4.
- All models are built on the TSMC 28HP process and interface with a PCIe 3x16 connector.

Model	Launch Date	Code Name	Transistors (billion)	Die Size (mm^{2})	Clock Rate		Core Config	Memory Configuration				Cache		Fillrate		Processing Power (GFLOPS)		TDP (Watts)	Power Connectors	MSRP (USD)
Model	Launch Date	Code Name	Transistors (billion)	Die Size (mm^{2})	Base (Boost) (MHz)	Memory (MHZ) (GT/s)	Core Config	Size (GB)	DRAM Type	Bus Width (bit)	Bandwidth (GB/s)	L1 per SMM (KB)	L2 (MB)	Pixel (GP/s)	Texture (GT/s)	Single Precision	Double Precision	TDP (Watts)	Power Connectors	MSRP (USD)
GeForce GTX 950 Low Power	March; 1, 2016	GM206-251-A1	2.94	228	1026 (1190)	1653 (6.6)	768:48:32:6	2	GDDR5	128	105.8	48	1	32.83 (38.08)	49.25 (57.12)	1,575.94 (1,827.84)	49.25 (57.12)	75	None	$159
GeForce GTX 950	August; 20, 2015	GM206-250-A1	2.94	228	1024 (1188)	1653 (6.6)	768:48:32:6	2	GDDR5	128	105.8	48	1	32.77 (38.02)	49.15 (57.02)	1,572.86 (1,824.77)	49.15 (57.02)	90	1x 6-Pin	$159
GeForce GTX 950 OEM	2016	GM206S	2.94	228	937 (1203)	1253 (5.0)	1024:64:32:8	2	GDDR5	128	80.19	48	1	29.98 (38.50)	59.97 (76.99)	1,918.98 (2,463.74)	59.97 (76.99)	?	None	OEM
GeForce GTX 960	January; 22, 2015	GM206-300-A1	2.94	228	1127 (1178)	1753 (7.0)	1024:64:32:8	2	GDDR5	128	112.2	48	1	36.06 (37.70)	72.13 (75.39)	2,308.10 (2,412.54)	72.13 (75.39)	120	1x 6-Pin	$199
GeForce GTX 960 OEM	November; 26, 2015	GM206	2.94	228	1176 (1201)	1753 (7.0)	1024:64:32:8	4	GDDR5	128	112.2	48	1	37.63 (38.43)	75.26 (76.86)	2,408.45 (2,459.65)	75.26 (76.86)	?	None	OEM
GeForce GTX 960 OEM	November; 26, 2015	GM204	5.2	398	924 (1038)	1253 (5.0)	1280:80:48:10	3	GDDR5	192	120.3	48	1.5	44.35 (49.82)	73.92 (83.04)	2,365.44 (2,657.28)	73.92 (83.04)	?	None	OEM
GeForce GTX 970	September; 19, 2014	GM204-200-A1	5.2	398	1050 (1178)	1753 (7.0)	1664:104:56:13	4	GDDR5	256	224.4	48	2	58.80 (65.97)	109.20 (122.51)	3,494.40 (3,920.38)	109.20 (122.51)	148	2x 6-Pin	$329
GeForce GTX 980	September; 18, 2014	GM204-400-A1	5.2	398	1127 (1216)	1753 (7.0)	2048:128:64:16	4	GDDR5	256	224.4	48	2	72.13 (77.82)	144.26 (155.65)	4,616.19 (4,980.74)	144.26 (155.65)	165	2x 6-Pin	$549
GeForce GTX 980 Ti	June; 2, 2015	GM200-310-A1	8	601	1000 (1076)	1753 (7.0)	2816:176:96:22	6	GDDR5	384	336.6	48	3	96.00 (103.30)	176.00 (189.38)	5,632.00 (6,060.03)	176.00 (189.38)	250	1x 6-Pin + 1x 8-Pin	$649
GeForce GTX TITAN X	March; 17, 2015	GM200-400-A1	8	601	1000 (1089)	1753 (7.0)	3072:192:96:24	12	GDDR5	384	336.6	48	3	96.00 (104.54)	192.00 (209.09)	6,144.00 (6,690.82)	192.00 (209.09)	250	1x 6-Pin + 1x 8-Pin	$999

=== GeForce 10 series ===
- All models support Direct3D 12 (12_1), OpenGL 4.6, OpenCL 3.0, Vulkan 1.4, and CUDA 6.1.

Model	Launch Date	Code Name	Fab (nm)	Transistors (billion)	Die Size (mm^{2})	Bus Interface	Clock Rate		Core Config	Cache		Memory Configuration				Fillrate		Processing Power (GFLOPS)			TDP (Watts)	Power Connectors	Release Price (USD)	
Model	Launch Date	Code Name	Fab (nm)	Transistors (billion)	Die Size (mm^{2})	Bus Interface	Base (Boost) (MHz)	Memory (MHz) (GT/s)	Core Config	L1 Per SM(X) (KB)	L2 (MB)	Size (GB)	DRAM Type	Bus Width (bit)	Bandwidth (GB/s)	Pixel (GP/s)	Texture (GT/s)	Half Precision	Single Precision	Double Precision	TDP (Watts)	Power Connectors	MSRP	Founders Edition
GeForce GT 1010 OEM	January; 13, 2021	GP108-200-A1	Samsung; 14LPP	1.8	74	PCIe 3x4	1228 (1468)	1502 (6.0)	256:16:8:2	16	0.25	2	GDDR5	64	48.1	9.82 (11.74)	19.65 (23.49)	n/a	628.74 (751.62)	26.20 (31.32)	30	None	OEM	n/a
GeForce GT 1010 OEM	January; 13, 2021	GP108-200-A1	Samsung; 14LPP	1.8	74	PCIe 3x4	1152 (1380)	1050 (2.1)	256:16:8:2	16	0.25	2	DDR4	64	16.8	9.22 (11.04)	18.43 (22.08)	n/a	590.82 (706.56)	24.58 (29.44)	20	None	OEM	n/a
GeForce GT 1030	March; 12, 2018	GP108-310-A1	Samsung; 14LPP	1.8	74	PCIe 3x4	1152 (1379)	1050 (2.1)	384:24:16:3	48	0.5	2	DDR4	64	16.8	18.43 (22.06)	27.65 (33.10)	13.82 (16.55)	884.74 (1,059.07)	27.65 (33.10)	20	None	$79	n/a
GeForce GT 1030	May; 17, 2017	GP108-300-A1	Samsung; 14LPP	1.8	74	PCIe 3x4	1228 (1468)	1502 (6.0)	384:24:16:3	48	0.5	2	GDDR5	64	48.1	19.63 (23.49)	29.47 (35.23)	14.74 (17.62)	943.1 (1,127.42)	29.47 (35.23)	30	None	$69	n/a
GeForce GT 1030	September; 30, 2018	GK107	TSMC; 28HP	1.27	118	PCIe 3x16	1058	1250 (5.0)	384:32:16:2	16	0.25	2	GDDR5	128	80.0	16.93	33.86	n/a	812.54	33.86	65	1x 6-Pin	?	n/a
GeForce GTX 1050	October; 25, 2016	GP107-300-A1	Samsung; 14LPP	3.3	132	PCIe 3x16	1354 (1455)	1752 (7.0)	640:40:32:5	48	1	2	GDDR5	128	112.1	43.33 (46.56)	54.16 (58.20)	27.08 (29.10)	1,733.12 (1,862.40)	54.16 (58.20)	75	None	$109	n/a
GeForce GTX 1050	May; 21, 2018	GP107-301-K1-A1	Samsung; 14LPP	3.3	132	PCIe 3x16	1392 (1518)	1752 (7.0)	768:48:24:6	48	0.75	3	GDDR5	96	84.1	33.41 (36.43)	66.82 (72.86)	33.41 (36.43)	2,138.11 (2,331.65)	66.82 (72.86)	75	None	$109	n/a
GeForce GTX 1050 Ti	October; 25, 2016	GP107-400-A1	Samsung; 14LPP	3.3	132	PCIe 3x16	1291 (1392)	1752 (7.0)	768:48:32:6	48	1	4	GDDR5	128	112.1	41.31 (44.54)	61.97 (66.82)	30.98 (33.41)	1,982.98 (2,138.11)	61.97 (66.82)	75	None	$139	n/a
GeForce GTX 1060	December; 25, 2016	GP104-140-KA-A1	TSMC; 16FF	7.2	314	PCIe 3x16	1506 (1708)	2002 (8.0)	1152:72:48:9	48	1.5	3	GDDR5	192	192.2	72.29 (81.98)	108.43 (122.98)	54.22 (61.49)	3,469.82 (3,935.23)	108.43 (122.98)	120	1x 6-Pin	$199	n/a
GeForce GTX 1060	August; 18, 2016	GP106-300-A1	TSMC; 16FF	4.4	200	PCIe 3x16	1506 (1708)	2002 (8.0)	1152:72:48:9	48	1.5	3	GDDR5	192	192.2	72.29 (81.98)	108.43 (122.98)	54.22 (61.49)	3,469.82 (3,935.23)	108.43 (122.98)	120	1x 6-Pin	$199	n/a
GeForce GTX 1060 OEM	December; 26, 2017	GP106-350-K3-A1	TSMC; 16FF	4.4	200	PCIe 3x16	1506 (1709)	2002 (8.0)	1280:80:48:10	48	1.25	5	GDDR5	160	160.2	72.29 (82.03)	120.48 (136.72)	60.24 (68.36)	3,855.36 (4,375.04)	120.48 (136.72)	120	1x 6-Pin	OEM	n/a
GeForce GTX 1060 6 GB	March; 8, 2018	GP104-150-KA-A1	TSMC; 16FF	7.2	314	PCIe 3x16	1506 (1708)	2002 (8.0)	1280:80:48:10	48	1.5	6	GDDR5	192	192.2	72.29 (81.98)	120.48 (136.64)	60.24 (68.32)	3,855.36 (4,372.48)	120.48 (136.64)	120	1x 6-Pin	$299	n/a
GeForce GTX 1060 6 GB GDDR5X	October; 18, 2018	GP104-150-KA-A1	TSMC; 16FF	7.2	314	PCIe 3x16	1506 (1709)	1001 (8.0)	1280:80:48:10	48	1.5	6	GDDR5X	192	192.2	72.29 (82.03)	120.48 (136.72)	60.24 (68.36)	3,855.36 (4,375.04)	120.48 (136.72)	120	1x 6-Pin	$299	n/a
GeForce GTX 1060 Rev. 2	July; 19, 2016	GP106-400-A1	TSMC; 16FF	4.4	200	PCIe 3x16	1506 (1709)	2002 (8.0)	1280:80:48:10	48	1.5	6	GDDR5	192	192.2	72.29 (82.03)	120.48 (136.72)	60.24 (68.36)	3,855.36 (4,375.04)	120.48 (136.72)	120	1x 6-Pin	$249	$299
GeForce GTX 1060 Rev. 2	April; 20, 2017	GP106-410-A1	TSMC; 16FF	4.4	200	PCIe 3x16	1506 (1709)	2257 (9.0)	1280:80:48:10	48	1.5	6	GDDR5	192	216.7	72.29 (82.03)	120.48 (136.72)	60.24 (68.36)	3,855.36 (4,375.04)	120.48 (136.72)	120	1x 6-Pin	$299	n/a
GeForce GTX 1070	June; 10, 2016	GP104-200-A1	TSMC; 16FF	7.2	314	PCIe 3x16	1506 (1683)	2002 (8.0)	1920:120:64:15	48	2	8	GDDR5	256	256.3	96.38 (107.71)	180.72 (201.96)	90.3 (100.98)	5,783.04 (6,462.72)	180.72 (201.96)	150	1x 8-Pin	$379	$449
GeForce GTX 1070 GDDR5X	December; 4, 2018	GP104-200-A1	TSMC; 16FF	7.2	314	PCIe 3x16	1506 (1683)	1001 (8.0)	1920:120:64:15	48	2	8	GDDR5X	256	256.3	96.38 (107.71)	180.72 (201.96)	90.3 (100.98)	5,783.04 (6,462.72)	180.72 (201.96)	150	1x 8-Pin	$379	$449
GeForce GTX 1070 Ti	November; 2, 2017	GP104-300-A1	TSMC; 16FF	7.2	314	PCIe 3x16	1607 (1683)	2002 (8.0)	2432:152:64:19	48	2	8	GDDR5	256	256.3	102.85 (107.71)	244.26 (255.82)	122.13 (127.91)	7,816.45 (8,186.11)	244.26 (255.82)	180	1x 8-Pin	$399	$449
GeForce GTX 1080	May; 27, 2016	GP104-400-A1	TSMC; 16FF	7.2	314	PCIe 3x16	1607 (1733)	1251 (10)	2560:160:64:20	48	2	8	GDDR5X	256	320.3	102.85 (110.91)	257.12 (277.28)	128.56 (138.64)	8,227.84 (8,872.96)	257.12 (277.28)	180	1x 8-Pin	$599	$699
GeForce GTX 1080	April; 20, 2017	GP104-410-A1	TSMC; 16FF	7.2	314	PCIe 3x16	1607 (1733)	1376 (11.0)	2560:160:64:20	48	2	8	GDDR5X	256	352.3	102.85 (110.91)	257.12 (277.28)	128.56 (138.64)	8,227.84 (8,872.96)	257.12 (277.28)	180	1x 8-Pin	$499	$699
GeForce GTX 1080 Ti	March; 5, 2017	GP102-350-K1-A1	TSMC; 16FF	11.8	471	PCIe 3x16	1481 (1582)	1376 (11.0)	3584:224:88:28	48	2.75	11	GDDR5X	352	484.4	130.33 (139.22)	331.74 (354.37)	165.87 (177.18)	10,615.81 (11,339.78)	331.74 (354.37)	250	1x 6-Pin + 1x 8-Pin	$699	$699
TITAN X Pascal	August; 2, 2016	GP102-400-A1	TSMC; 16FF	11.8	471	PCIe 3x16	1417 (1531)	1251 (10.0)	3584:224:96:28	48	3	12	GDDR5X	384	480.4	136.03 (146.98)	317.41 (342.94)	158.70 (171.47)	10,157.06 (10,974.21)	317.41 (342.94)	250	1x 6-Pin + 1x 8-Pin	n/a	$1199
TITAN Xp	April; 6, 2017	GP102-450-A1	TSMC; 16FF	11.8	471	PCIe 3x16	1405 (1582)	1426 (11.4)	3840:240:96:30	48	3	12	GDDR5X	384	547.6	134.88 (151.87)	337.20 (379.68)	168.60 (189.84)	10,790.40 (12,149.76)	337.20 (379.68)	250	1x 6-Pin + 1x 8-Pin	n/a	$1199
Model	Launch Date	Code Name	Fab (nm)	Transistors (billion)	Die Size (mm^{2})	Bus Interface	Base (Boost) (MHz)	Memory (MHz) (GT/s)	Core Config	L1 Per SM(X) (KB)	L2 (MB)	Size (GB)	DRAM Type	Bus Width (bit)	Bandwidth (GB/s)	Pixel (GP/s)	Texture (GT/s)	Half Precision	Single Precision	Double Precision	TDP (Watts)	Power Connectors	MSRP	Founders Edition
Model	Launch Date	Code Name	Fab (nm)	Transistors (billion)	Die Size (mm^{2})	Bus Interface	Clock Rate		Core Config	Cache		Memory Configuration				Fillrate		Processing Power (GFLOPS)			TDP (Watts)	Power Connectors	Release Price (USD)	

=== Volta series ===
- All models support Direct3D 12 (12_1), OpenGL 4.6, OpenCL 3.0, Vulkan 1.4, and CUDA 7.0.
- NVENC 6th gen.
- Tensor core 1st gen.
- All models are built on the TSMC 12FFN process with 21.1 billion transistors and a die size of 815 mm^{2}.

Model	Launch Date	Code Name	Bus Interface	Clock Rate		Core Config	Cache		Memory Configuration				Fillrate		Processing Power (TFLOPS)				TDP (Watts)	Power Connectors	MSRP (USD)
Model	Launch Date	Code Name	Bus Interface	Base (Boost) (MHz)	Memory (MHz) (GT/s)	Core Config	L1 per SM (KB)	L2 (MB)	Size (GB)	DRAM Type	Bus Width (bit)	Bandwidth (GB/s)	Pixel (GP/s)	Texture (GT/s)	Half Precision	Single Precision	Double Precision	Tensor (AI) Half Precision	TDP (Watts)	Power Connectors	MSRP (USD)
Nvidia Titan V	December; 7, 2017	GV100-400-A1	PCIe 3x16	1200 (1455)	848 (1.7)	5120:320: 96:80:640	96	4.5	12	HBM2	3072	651.3	115.20 (139.68)	384.00 (465.60)	24.58 (29.80)	12.29 (14.90)	6.14 (7.45)	98.30 (119.19)	250	1x 6-Pin + 1x 8-Pin	$2999
Nvidia Titan V (CEO Edition)	June; 21, 2018	GV100-???-A1	PCIe 3x16	1200 (1455)	848 (1.7)	5120:320: 128:80:640	128	6	32	HBM2	4096	868.4	153.60 (186.24)	384.00 (465.60)	24.58 (29.80)	12.29 (14.90)	6.14 (7.45)	98.30 (119.19)	250	1x 6-Pin + 1x 8-Pin	$5999

=== GeForce GTX 16 series ===
- All models support Direct3D 12 (12_1), OpenGL 4.6, OpenCL 3.0, Vulkan 1.4, and CUDA 7.5.
- NVENC 5th gen.
- All models are built on the TSMC 12FFN process and interface with a PCIe 3x16 connector.

Model	Launch Date	Code Name	Transistors (billion)	Die Size (mm^{2})	Clock Rate		Core Config	Cache		Memory Configuration				Fillrate		Processing Power			TDP (Watts)	Power Connectors	MSRP (USD)
Model	Launch Date	Code Name	Transistors (billion)	Die Size (mm^{2})	Base (Boost) (MHz)	Memory (MHz) (GT/s)	Core Config	L1 per SM (KB)	L2 (MB)	Size (GB)	DRAM Type	Bus Width (bit)	Bandwidth (GB/s)	Pixel (GP/s)	Texture (GT/s)	Half Precision (TFLOPS)	Single Precision (TFLOPS)	Double Precision (GFLOPS)	TDP (Watts)	Power Connectors	MSRP (USD)
GeForce GTX 1630	June; 28, 2022	TU117-150-KA-A1	4.7	200	1740 (1785)	1500 (12.0)	512:32:16:8	64	1	4	GDDR6	64	96.0	27.84 (28.56)	55.68 (57.12)	3.564 (3.656)	1.782 (1.828)	55.68 (57.12)	75	None	$149
GeForce GTX 1650	April; 23, 2019	TU117-300-A1	4.7	200	1485 (1665)	2001 (8.0)	896:56:32:14	64	1	4	GDDR5	128	128.1	47.52 (53.28)	83.16 (93.24)	5.322 (5.967)	2.661 (2.984)	83.16 (93.24)	75	None	$149
GeForce GTX 1650	April; 1, 2020	TU117-300-A1	4.7	200	1410 (1590)	1500 (12.0)	896:56:32:14	64	1	4	GDDR6	128	192.0	45.12 (50.88)	78.96 (89.04)	5.053 (5.699)	2.527 (2.849)	78.96 (89.04)	75	None	$149
GeForce GTX 1650	July; 7, 2020	TU116-150-KA-A1	6.6	284	1410 (1590)	1500 (12.0)	896:56:32:14	64	1	4	GDDR6	128	192.0	45.12 (50.88)	78.96 (89.04)	5.053 (5.699)	2.527 (2.849)	78.96 (89.04)	80	None	$149
GeForce GTX 1650	June; 18, 2020	TU106-125-KAB-A1	10.8	445	1410 (1590)	1500 (12.0)	896:56:32:14	64	1	4	GDDR6	128	192.0	45.12 (50.88)	78.96 (89.04)	5.053 (5.699)	2.527 (2.849)	78.96 (89.04)	90	1x 6-Pin	$149
GeForce GTX 1650 Super	November; 22, 2019	TU116-250-KA-A1	6.6	284	1530 (1725)	1500 (12.0)	1280:80:32:20	64	1	4	GDDR6	128	192.0	48.96 (55.20)	122.40 (138.00)	7.834 (8.832)	3.917 (4.416)	122.40 (138.00)	100	1x 6-Pin	$159
GeForce GTX 1660	March; 14, 2019	TU116-300-A1	6.6	284	1530 (1785)	2001 (8.0)	1408:88:48:22	64	1.5	6	GDDR5	192	192.1	73.44 (85.68)	134.64 (157.08)	8.617 (10.053)	4.308 (5.027)	134.64 (157.08)	120	1x 8-Pin	$219
GeForce GTX 1660 Super	October; 29, 2019	TU116-300-A1	6.6	284	1530 (1785)	1750 (14.0)	1408:88:48:22	64	1.5	6	GDDR6	192	336.0	73.44 (85.68)	134.64 (157.08)	8.617 (10.053)	4.308 (5.027)	134.64 (157.08)	125	1x 8-Pin	$229
GeForce GTX 1660 Ti	February; 21, 2019	TU116-400-A1	6.6	284	1500 (1770)	1500 (12.0)	1536:96:48:24	64	1.5	6	GDDR6	192	288.0	72.00 (84.96)	144.00 (169.92)	9.216 (10.875)	4.608 (5,437)	144.00 (169.92)	120	1x 8-Pin	$279

=== GeForce RTX 20 series ===
- All models support Direct3D 12 Ultimate (12_2), OpenGL 4.6, OpenCL 3.0, Vulkan 1.3, and CUDA 7.5.
- NVENC 7th gen.
- Tensor core 2nd gen.
- RT Core 1st gen.
- NVIDIA DLSS 1.0.
- Founder's Edition variants come from the factory with a higher boost clock.
- All models are built on the TSMC 12FFN process and interface with a PCIe 3x16 connector.
- Ray Tracing performance has been omitted from the table as it is fundamentally not possible to calculate exact performance values for RT Cores.

Model	Launch Date	Code Name	Transistors (billion)	Die Size (mm^{2})	Clock Rate		Core Config	Cache		Memory Configuration				Fillrate		Processing Power (TFLOPS)				TDP (Watts)	Power Connectors	Release Price (USD)	
Model	Launch Date	Code Name	Transistors (billion)	Die Size (mm^{2})	Base Boost (MHz)	Memory (MHz) (GT/s)	Core Config	L1 per SM (KB)	L2 (MB)	Size (GB)	DRAM Type	Bus Width (bit)	Bandwidth (GB/s)	Pixel (GP/s)	Texture (GT/s)	Half Precsion	Single Precision	Double Precision	Tensor (AI) Half Precsion	TDP (Watts)	Power Connectors	MSRP	Founders Edition
GeForce RTX 2060	January; 7, 2019	TU106-200A-KA-A1	10.8	445	1365 (1680)	1750 (14.0)	1920:120:48: 30:240:30	64	3	6	GDDR6	192	336.0	65.52 (80.64)	163.80 (201.60)	10.48 (12.90)	5.242 (6.451)	0.164 (0.202)	41.93 (51.61)	160	1x 8-Pin	$349	—N/a
GeForce RTX 2060	January; 10, 2020	TU104-150-KC-A1	13.6	545	1365 (1680)	1750 (14.0)	1920:120:48: 30:240:30	64	3	6	GDDR6	192	336.0	65.52 (80.64)	163.80 (201.60)	10.48 (12.90)	5.242 (6.451)	0.164 (0.202)	41.93 (51.61)	160	1x 8-Pin	$299	—N/a
GeForce RTX 2060	December; 7, 2021	TU106-300-KA-A1	10.8	445	1470 (1650)	1750 (14.0)	2176:136:64: 34:272:34	64	3	12	GDDR6	192	336.0	94.08 (105.60)	199.92 (224.40)	12.795 (14.362)	6.397 (7.181)	0.200 (0.224)	51.18 (57.45)	184	1x 8-Pin	$299	—N/a
GeForce RTX 2060 SUPER	July; 9, 2019	TU106-410-A1	10.8	445	1470 (1650)	1750 (14.0)	2176:136:64: 34:272:34	64	4	8	GDDR6	256	448.0	94.08 (105.60)	199.92 (224.40)	12.795 (14.362)	6.397 (7.181)	0.200 (0.224)	51.18 (57.45)	175	1x 8-Pin	$399	
GeForce RTX 2070	October; 17, 2018	TU106-400A-A1	10.8	445	1410 (1620)	1750 (14.0)	2304:144:64: 36:288:36	64	4	8	GDDR6	256	448.0	90.24 (103.68)	203.04 (233.28)	12.995 (14.930)	6.497 (7.465)	0.203 (0.233)	51.98 (59.72)	175	1x 8-Pin	$499	$599
GeForce RTX 2070 SUPER	July; 9, 2019	TU104-410-A1	13.6	545	1605 (1770)	1750 (14.0)	2560:160:64: 40:320:40	64	4	8	GDDR6	256	448.0	102.72 (113.28)	256.80 (283.20)	16.44 (18.12)	8.218 (9.062)	0.257 (0.283)	65.74 (72.50)	215	1x 6-Pin + 1x 8-Pin	$499	$499
GeForce RTX 2080	September; 20, 2018	TU104-400A-A1	13.6	545	1515 (1710)	1750 (14.0)	2944:184:64: 46:368:46	64	4	8	GDDR6	256	448.0	96.96 (109.44)	278.76 (314.64)	17.84 (20.137)	8.920 (10.068)	0.279 (0.315)	71.36 (80.55)	215	1x 6-Pin + 1x 8-Pin	$699	$799
GeForce RTX 2080 SUPER	July; 23, 2019	TU104-450-A1	13.6	545	1650 (1815)	1973 (15.5)	3072:192:64: 48:384:48	64	4	8	GDDR6	256	495.9	105.60 (116.16)	316.80 (348.48)	20.275 (22.303)	10.138 (11.151)	0.317 (0.348)	81.10 (89.21)	250	1x 6-Pin + 1x 8-Pin	$699	$699
GeForce RTX 2080 Ti	September; 20, 2018	TU102-300A-K1-A1	18.6	754	1350 (1545)	1750 (14.0)	4352:272:88: 68:544:68	64	5.5	11	GDDR6	352	616.0	118.80 (135.96)	367.20 (420.24)	23.501 (26.895)	11.750 (13.448)	0.367 (0.420)	94.00 (107.58)	250	2x 8-Pin	$999	$1,199
Titan RTX	December; 18, 2018	TU102-400-A1	18.6	754	1350 (1770)	1750 (14.0)	4608:288:96: 72:576:72	64	6	24	GDDR6	384	672.0	129.60 ( 169.92)	388.80 (509.76)	24.883 (32.625)	12.442 (16.312)	0.389 (0.510)	99.53 (130.50)	280	2x 8-Pin	n/a	$2,499

=== GeForce RTX 30 series ===
- All models support Direct3D 12 Ultimate (12_2), OpenGL 4.6, OpenCL 3.0, Vulkan 1.3 and CUDA 8.6.
- NVENC 7th gen.
- Tensor core 3rd gen.
- RT Core 2nd gen.
- NVIDIA DLSS 2.0.
- All models are built on the Samsung 8LPP process.
- Only the RTX 3090 and RTX 3090 Ti support NVLink.

Model	Launch Date	Code Name	Transistors (billion)	Die size (mm^{2})	Bus Interface	Clock Rate		Core Config	Cache		Memory Configuration				Fillrate		Processing Power (TFLOPS)						TDP (Watts)	Release Price (USD)	
Model	Launch Date	Code Name	Transistors (billion)	Die size (mm^{2})	Bus Interface	Base Boost (MHz)	Memory (MHz) (GT/s)	Core Config	L1 per SM (KB)	L2 (MB)	Size (GB)	Bus Type	Bus Width (bit)	Bandwidth (GB/s)	Pixel (GP/s)	Texture (GT/s)	Half Precision (FP16 1:1)	Single Precision (FP32)	Double Precision (FP64 1:64)	Tensor (AI) BF16 Dense 1:1 (1x)	Tensor (AI) FP16 Sparse 2:4 (2x)	Ray Tracing (Note: Ray tracing performance is a rough estimate provided by NVIDIA, as it is not fundamentally possible to calculate exact performance values for RT cores working together. Base clock values were calculated from said values, which uses boost clocks.)	TDP (Watts)	MSRP	Founders Edition
GeForce RTX 3050 6 GB	February; 2, 2024	GA107-325-K2-A1	8.7	200.0	PCIe; 4 x8	1042 (1470)	1750 (14.0)	2304:72:32: 18:72:18	128	2	6	GDDR6	96	168.0	33.34 (47.04)	75.02 (105.84)	4.802 (6.774)		0.075 (0.106)	19.21 (27.10)	38.41 (54.19)	~11.5 (~16.2) (Note: The RTX 3050 6 GB, RTX 3050 OEM, and RTX 3060 OEM do not have advertised ray tracing performance values, they have been very roughly estimated by dividing and multiplying core and clocks from non-OEM variants.)	70	$179	—N/a
GeForce RTX 3050	December; 16, 2022	GA107-350-A1	8.7	200.0	PCIe; 4 x8	1552 (1777)	1750 (14.0)	2560:80:32: 20:80:20	128	2	8	GDDR6	128	224.0	49.66 (56.86)	124.16 (142.16)	7.946 (9.098)		0.124 (0.142)	31.78 (36.39)	63.57 (72.79)	15.9~ (~18.2)	115	$249	—N/a
GeForce RTX 3050	January; 4, 2022	GA106-150-KA-A1	12.0	276.0	PCIe; 4 x8	1552 (1777)	1750 (14.0)	2560:80:32: 20:80:20	128	2	8	GDDR6	128	224.0	49.66 (56.86)	124.16 (142.16)	7.946 (9.098)		0.124 (0.142)	31.78 (36.39)	63.57 (72.79)	15.9~ (~18.2)	130	$249	—N/a
GeForce RTX 3050 OEM	January; 27, 2022	GA106-150-KA-A1	12.0	276.0	PCIe; 4 x8	1515 (1755)	1750 (14.0)	2304:72:32: 18:72:18	128	2	8	GDDR6	128	224.0	48.48 (56.16)	109.08 (126.36)	6.981 (8.087)		0.109 (0.126)	27.92 (32.35)	55.85 (64.70)	~11.5 (~16.2)	130	OEM	—N/a
GeForce RTX 3060	October; 12, 2022	GA106-302-A1	12.0	276.0	PCIe; 4 x16	1320 (1777)	1875 (15.0)	3584:112:48: 28:112:28	128	3	8	GDDR6	128	224.0	63.36 (85.30)	147.84 (199.02)	9.462 (12.738)		0.148 (0.199)	37.85 (50.95)	75.69 (101.90)	~18.6 (~25.0)	170	$329	—N/a
GeForce RTX 3060	October; 2022	GA104	17.4	392.5	PCIe; 4 x16	1320 (1777)	1875 (15.0)	3584:112:64: 28:112:28	128	3	8	GDDR6	128	224.0	84.48 (113.72)	147.84 (199.02)	9.462 (12.738)		0.148 (0.199)	37.85 (50.95)	75.69 (101.90)	~18.6 (~25.0)	195	$329	—N/a
GeForce RTX 3060 12 GB	February; 25, 2021	GA106-300-A1	12.0	276.0	PCIe; 4 x16	1320 (1777)	1875 (15.0)	3584:112:48: 28:112:28	128	3	12	GDDR6	192	336.0	63.36 (85.30)	147.84 (199.02)	9.462 (12.738)		0.148 (0.199)	37.85 (50.95)	75.69 (101.90)	~18.6 (~25.0)	170	$329	—N/a
GeForce RTX 3060 12 GB	September; 1, 2021	GA104-150-KC-A1	17.4	392.5	PCIe; 4 x16	1320 (1777)	1875 (15.0)	3584:112:64: 28:112:28	128	3	12	GDDR6	192	336.0	84.48 (113.72)	147.84 (199.02)	9.462 (12.738)		0.148 (0.199)	37.85 (50.95)	75.69 (101.90)	~18.6 (~25.0)	170	$329	—N/a
GeForce RTX 3060 OEM	February; 25, 2021	GA106-400-A1	17.4	392.5	PCIe; 4 x16	1627 (1852)	1750 (14.0)	3840:120:48: 30:120:30	128	3	6	GDDR6	192	336.0	78.10 (88.90)	195.24 (222.24)	12.395 (14.223)		0.195 (0.222)	49.98 (56.89)	99.96 (113.79)	~24.5 (~27.9)	185	OEM	—N/a
GeForce RTX 3060 Ti	December; 2, 2020	GA104-200-A1	17.4	392.5	PCIe; 4 x16	1410 (1665)	1750 (14.0)	4864:152:80: 38:152:38	128	4	8	GDDR6	256	448.0	112.80 (133.20)	214.32 (253.08)	13.716 (16.197)		0.214 (0.253)	54.87 (64.79)	109.72 (129.58)	~27.4 (~32.4)	200	$399	
GeForce RTX 3060 Ti	February; 23, 2022	GA103-200-A1	22.0	496.0	PCIe; 4 x16	1410 (1665)	1750 (14.0)	4864:152:80: 38:152:38	128	4	8	GDDR6	256	448.0	112.80 (133.20)	214.32 (253.08)	13.716 (16.197)		0.214 (0.253)	54.87 (64.79)	109.72 (129.58)	~27.4 (~32.4)	200	$399	
GeForce RTX 3060 Ti GDDR6X	October; 19, 2022	GA104-202-A1	17.4	392.5	PCIe; 4 x16	1410 (1665)	1188 (19.0)	4864:152:80: 38:152:38	128	4	8	GDDR6X	256	608.3	112.80 (133.20)	214.32 (253.08)	13.716 (16.197)		0.214 (0.253)	54.87 (64.79)	109.72 (129.58)	~27.4 (~32.4)	225	$399	
GeForce RTX 3070	October; 29, 2020	GA104-300-A1	17.4	392.5	PCIe; 4 x16	1500 (1725)	1750 (14.0)	5888:184:96: 46:184:46	128	4	8	GDDR6	256	448.0	144.00 (165.60)	276.00 (317.40)	17.664 (20.314)		0.276 (0.317)	70.66 (81.25)	141.31 (162.51)	~35.3 (~40.6)	220	$499	
GeForce RTX 3070 Ti	June; 10, 2021	GA104-400-A1	17.4	392.5	PCIe; 4 x16	1575 (1770)	1188 (19.0)	6144:192:96: 48:192:48	128	4	8	GDDR6X	256	608.3	151.20 (165.60)	302.40 (331.20)	19.354 (21.750)		0.302 (0.331)	77.41 (87.00)	154.83 (174.00)	~36.0 (~43.5)	290	$599	
GeForce RTX 3070 Ti	October; 21, 2022	GA102-150-A1	28.3	628.4	PCIe; 4 x16	1575 (1770)	1188 (19.0)	6144:192:96: 48:192:48	128	4	8	GDDR6X	256	608.3	151.20 (165.60)	302.40 (331.20)	19.354 (21.750)		0.302 (0.331)	77.41 (87.00)	154.83 (174.00)	~36.0 (~43.5)	290	$599	
GeForce RTX 3070 Ti		GA102-150-KCD	28.3	628.4	PCIe; 4 x16	1575 (1770)	1188 (19.0)	6144:192:96: 48:192:48	128	4	8	GDDR6X	256	608.3	151.20 (165.60)	302.40 (331.20)	19.354 (21.750)		0.302 (0.331)	77.41 (87.00)	154.83 (174.00)	~36.0 (~43.5)	320	$599	
GeForce RTX 3080	September; 17, 2020	GA102-200-KD-A1	28.3	628.4	PCIe; 4 x16	1440 (1710)	1188 (19.0)	8704:272:96: 68:272:68	128	5	10	GDDR6X	320	760.3	138.24 (164.16)	391.68 (465.12)	25.068 (29.768)		0.392 (0.465)	100.27 (119.07)	200.54 (238.14)	~50.1 (~59.5)	320	$699	
GeForce RTX 3080 12 GB	January; 11, 2022	GA102-220-A1	28.3	628.4	PCIe; 4 x16	1260 (1710)	1188 (19.0)	8960:280:96: 70:280:70	128	6	12	GDDR6X	384	912.4	120.96 (164.16)	352.80 (478.80)	22.579 (30.64)		0.353 (0.479)	90.32 (122.57)	180.63 (245.15)	~45.2 (~61.3)	350	$799	
GeForce RTX 3080 Ti	June; 3, 2021	GA102-225-A1	28.3	628.4	PCIe; 4 x16	1365 (1665)	1188 (19.0)	10240:320:112: 80:320:80	128	6	12	GDDR6X	384	912.4	152.88 (186.48)	436.80 (532.80)	27.955 (34.099)		0.437 (0.533)	111.82 (136.40)	223.64 (272.80)	~55.9 (~68.2)	350	$1199	
GeForce RTX 3080 Ti 20 GB	January; 2022	GA102-250-KD-A1	28.3	628.4	PCIe; 4 x16	1335 (1665)	1188 (19.0)	10240:320:112: 80:320:80	128	6	20	GDDR6X	320	760.3	149.52 (186.48)	427.20 (532.80)	27.341 (34.099)		0.427 (0.533)	109.36 (136.40)	218.73 (272.80)	~54.7 (~68.2)	350	$1199	
GeForce RTX 3090	September; 24, 2020	GA102-300-A1	28.3	628.4	PCIe; 4 x16	1395 (1695)	1219 (19.5)	10496:328:112: 82:328:82	128	6	24	GDDR6X	384	936.2	156.24 (189.84)	457.56 (555.96)	29.284 (35.581)		0.458 (0.556)	117.14 (142.33)	234.27 (284.65)	~58.5 (~71.1)	350	$1499	
GeForce RTX 3090 Ti	March; 29, 2022	GA102-350-A1	28.3	628.4	PCIe; 4 x16	1560 (1860)	1313 (21.0)	10752:336:112: 84:336:84	128	6	24	GDDR6X	384	1008.3	174.72 (208.32)	524.16 (624.96)	33.546 (39.997)		0.524 (0.625)	134.18 (159.99)	268.37 (319.98)	~67.0 (~79.9)	450	$1999	

=== GeForce RTX 40 series ===
- All models support Direct3D 12 Ultimate (12_2), OpenGL 4.6, OpenCL 3.0, Vulkan 1.3 and CUDA 8.9.
- Tensor core 4th gen.
- RT core 3rd gen.
- NVIDIA DLSS 3 & 3.5.
- NVENC 8th gen.
- NVLink is no longer supported.
- SER 1.0. (Shader Execution Reordering)
- All models are built on the TSMC 4N process.

Model	Launch Date	Code Name	Transistors (billion)	Die Size (mm^{2})	Bus Interface	Clock Rate		Core Config	Cache		Memory Configuration				Fillrate		Processing Power (TFLOPS)								TDP (Watts)	Release Price (USD)	
Model	Launch Date	Code Name	Transistors (billion)	Die Size (mm^{2})	Bus Interface	Base Boost (MHz)	Memory (MHz) (GT/s)	Core Config	L1 per SM (KB)	L2 (MB)	Size (GB)	Bus Type	Bus Width (bit)	Bandwidth (GB/s)	Pixel (GP/s)	Texture (GT/s)	Half Precision (FP16 1:1)	Single Precision (FP32)	Double Precision (FP64 1:64)	Tensor (AI) FP16 Dense 1:1 (1x)	Tensor (AI) FP8 Dense 1:1 (2x)	Tensor (AI) FP16 Sparse 2:4 (2x)	Tensor (AI) FP8 Sparse 2:4 (4x)	Ray Tracing (Note: Ray tracing performance is a rough estimate provided by NVIDIA, as it is not fundamentally possible to calculate exact performance values for RT cores working together. Base clock values were calculated from said values, which uses boost clocks.)	TDP (Watts)	MSRP	Founders Edition
GeForce RTX 4060	June; 29, 2023	AD107-400-A1	18.9	158.7	PCIe; 4 x8	1830 (2460)	2125 (17.0)	3072:96:48: 24:96:24	128	24	8	GDDR6	128	272.0	87.84 (118.08)	175.68 (236.16)	11.244 (15.114)		0.176 (0.236)	44.974 (60.457)	89.948 (120.914)		179.896 (241.828)	~26.0 (~35.0)	115	$299	—N/a
GeForce RTX 4060	April; 2024	AD106-155-A1	22.9	187.8	PCIe; 4 x8	1830 (2460)	2125 (17.0)	3072:96:48: 24:96:24	128	24	8	GDDR6	128	272.0	87.84 (118.08)	175.68 (236.16)	11.244 (15.114)		0.176 (0.236)	44.974 (60.457)	89.948 (120.914)		179.896 (241.828)	~26.0 (~35.0)	115	$299	—N/a
GeForce RTX 4060 Ti	May; 24, 2023	AD106-350-A1	22.9	187.8	PCIe; 4 x8	2310 (2535)	2250 (18.0)	4352:136:48: 34:136:34	128	32	8	GDDR6	128	288.0	110.88 (121.68)	314.16 (344.76)	20.106 (22.065)		0.314 (0.345)	80.425 (88.259)	160.85 (176.517)		321.700 (353.034)	~46.5 (~51.0)	160	$399	
GeForce RTX 4060 Ti	April; 2024	AD104-150-K1-A1	35.8	294.5	PCIe; 4 x8	2310 (2535)	2250 (18.0)	4352:136:48: 34:136:34	128	32	8	GDDR6	128	288.0	110.88 (121.68)	314.16 (344.76)	20.106 (22.065)		0.314 (0.345)	80.425 (88.259)	160.85 (176.517)		321.700 (353.034)	~46.5 (~51.0)	160	$399	
GeForce RTX 4060 Ti 16 GB	July; 18, 2023	AD106-351-A1	22.9	187.8	PCIe; 4 x8	2310 (2535)	2250 (18.0)	4352:136:48: 34:136:34	128	32	16	GDDR6	128	288.0	110.88 (121.68)	314.16 (344.76)	20.106 (22.065)		0.314 (0.345)	80.425 (88.259)	160.85 (176.517)		321.700 (353.034)	~46.5 (~51.0)	165	$499	—N/a
GeForce RTX 4070 GDDR6	August; 20, 2024	AD104-2??-A1	35.8	294.5	PCIe; 4 x16	1920 (2475)	2500 (20.0)	5888:184:64: 46:184:46	128	36	12	GDDR6	192	480.0	122.88 (158.40)	353.28 (455.40)	22.610 (29.146)		0.353 (0.455)	90.440 (116.582)	180.880 (233.165)		361.759 (466.330)	~51.0 (~67.0)	200	$599	
GeForce RTX 4070	April; 13, 2023	AD104-250-A1	35.8	294.5	PCIe; 4 x16	1920 (2475)	1313 (21.0)	5888:184:64: 46:184:46	128	36	12	GDDR6X	192	504.2	122.88 (158.40)	353.28 (455.40)	22.610 (29.146)		0.353 (0.455)	90.440 (116.582)	180.880 (233.165)		361.759 (466.330)	~51.0 (~67.0)	200	$599	
GeForce RTX 4070	March; 2024	AD103-175-K1-A1	45.9	378.6	PCIe; 4 x16	1920 (2475)	1313 (21.0)	5888:184:64: 46:184:46	128	36	12	GDDR6X	192	504.2	122.88 (158.40)	353.28 (455.40)	22.610 (29.146)		0.353 (0.455)	90.440 (116.582)	180.880 (233.165)		361.759 (466.330)	~51.0 (~67.0)	200	$599	
GeForce RTX 4070 Super	January; 17, 2024	AD104-350-A1	35.8	294.5	PCIe; 4 x16	1980 (2475)	1313 (21.0)	7168:224:80: 56:224:56	128	48	12	GDDR6X	192	504.2	154.80 (443.52)	443.52 (554.40)	28.385 (35.482)		0.444 (0.554)	113.541 (141.926)	227.082 (283.853)		454.164 (567.706)	~65.6 (~82.0)	220	$599	
GeForce RTX 4070 Ti	January; 5, 2023	AD104-400-A1	35.8	294.5	PCIe; 4 x16	2310 (2610)	1313 (21.0)	7680:240:80: 60:240:60	128	48	12	GDDR6X	192	504.2	184.80 (208.80)	554.40 (626.40)	35.482 (40.090)		0.554 (0.626)	141.926 (160.358)	283.853 (320.717)		567.706 (610.434)	~82.0 (~92.7)	285	$799	—N/a
GeForce RTX 4070 Ti Super	January; 24, 2024	AD103-275-A1	45.9	378.6	PCIe; 4 x16	2340 (2610)	1313 (21.0)	8448:264:96: 66:264:66	128	48	16	GDDR6X	256	672.3	224.64 (250.56)	617.76 (689.04)	39.537 (44.099)		0.618 (0.689)	158.147 (176.394)	316.293 (352.788)		632.586 (705.577)	~91.4 (~102.0)	285	$799	—N/a
GeForce RTX 4070 Ti Super	June; 10, 2024	AD102-175-KEF-A1	76.3	608.5	PCIe; 4 x16	2340 (2610)	1313 (21.0)	8448:264:96: 66:264:66	128	48	16	GDDR6X	256	672.3	224.64 (250.56)	617.76 (689.04)	39.537 (44.099)		0.618 (0.689)	158.147 (176.394)	316.293 (352.788)		632.586 (705.577)	~91.4 (~102.0)	285	$799	—N/a
GeForce RTX 4080	November; 16, 2022	AD103-300-A1	45.9	378.6	PCIe; 4 x16	2205 (2505)	1400 (22.4)	9728:304:112: 76:304:76	128	64	16	GDDR6X	256	716.8	246.96 (280.56)	670.32 (761.52)	42.900 (48.737)		0.670 (0.762)	171.602 (194.949)	343.204 (389.898)		686.408 (779.797)	~99.2 (~112.7)	320	$1199	
GeForce RTX 4080 Super	January; 31, 2024	AD103-400-A1	45.9	378.6	PCIe; 4 x16	2295 (2550)	1438 (23.0)	10240:320:112: 80:320:80	128	64	16	GDDR6X	256	736.3	257.04 (285.60)	734.40 (816.00)	47.002 (52.224)		0.734 (0.816)	188.006 (208.896)	376.013 (417.792)		752.026 (835.584)	~108.9 (~121.0)	320	$999	
GeForce RTX 4090 D	December; 28, 2023	AD102-250-A1	76.3	608.5	PCIe; 4 x16	2280 (2520)	1313 (21.0)	14592:456:176: 114:456:114	128	72	24	GDDR6X	384	1008.0	401.28 (443.52)	1039.68 (1149.12)	66.540 (73.544)		1.040 (1.149)	266.158 (294.174)	532.316 (588.349)		1046.632 (1176.699)	~153.8 (~170.0)	425	CN¥12,999 (USD $1599)	—N/a
GeForce RTX 4090	October; 12, 2022	AD102-300-A1	76.3	608.5	PCIe; 4 x16	2235 (2520)	1313 (21.0)	16384:512:176: 128:512:128	128	72	24	GDDR6X	384	1008.0	393.36 (443.52)	1144.32 (1290.24)	73.236 (82.575)		1.144 (1.290)	292.946 (330.301)	585.892 (660.603)		1171.784 (1321.206)	~169.4 (~191.0)	450	$1599	

=== GeForce RTX 50 series ===
- The GeForce RTX 50 series desktop GPUs are the first consumer GPUs to utilize GDDR7 VRAM.
- All models support Direct3D 12 Ultimate (12_2), OpenGL 4.6, OpenCL 3.0, Vulkan 1.4 and CUDA 12.0.
- NVENC 9th gen.
- NVIDIA DLSS 4.
- Tensor core 5th gen.
- RT core 4th gen.
- SER 2.0.
- LSS 1.0. (Linear Swept Spheres)
- All models are built on the TSMC 4N process.

Model	Launch Date	Code Name	Transistors (billion)	Die Size (mm^{2})	Bus Interface	Clock Rate		Core Config	Cache		Memory Configuration				Fillrate		Processing Power (TFLOPS)								TDP (Watts)	Release Price (USD)	
Model	Launch Date	Code Name	Transistors (billion)	Die Size (mm^{2})	Bus Interface	Base (Boost) (MHz)	Memory (MHz) (GT/s)	Core Config	L1 per SM (KB)	L2 (MB)	Size (GB)	Bus Type	Bus Width (bit)	Bandwidth (GB/s)	Pixel (GP/s)	Texture (GT/s)	Half Precision FP16 (1:1)	Single Precision FP32	Double Precision FP64 (1:64)	Tensor (AI)				Ray Tracing (Note: Ray tracing performance is a rough estimate provided by NVIDIA, as it is not fundamentally possible to calculate exact performance values for RT cores working together. Base clock values were calculated from said values, which uses boost clocks.)	TDP (Watts)	MSRP	Founders Edition
Model	Launch Date	Code Name	Transistors (billion)	Die Size (mm^{2})	Bus Interface	Base (Boost) (MHz)	Memory (MHz) (GT/s)	Core Config	L1 per SM (KB)	L2 (MB)	Size (GB)	Bus Type	Bus Width (bit)	Bandwidth (GB/s)	Pixel (GP/s)	Texture (GT/s)	Half Precision FP16 (1:1)	Single Precision FP32	Double Precision FP64 (1:64)	Dense FP16 (1:1)	Sparse FP16 (2:4) Dense FP8 (1:1)	Sparse FP8 (2:4) Dense FP4 (1:1)	Sparse FP4 (2:4)	Ray Tracing	TDP (Watts)	MSRP	Founders Edition
GeForce RTX 5050	July; 1, 2025	GB207-300-A1	16.9	149.0	PCIe; 5 x8	2317 (2572)	2500 (20.0)	2560:80:32: 20:80:20	128	24	8	GDDR6	128	320.0	74.14 (82.30)	185.36 (205.76)	11.863 (13.169)		0.185 (0.206)	47.452 (52.675)	94.904 (105.349)	189.809 (210.698)	379.617 (421.396)	~36.0 (~40.0)	130	$249	—N/a
GeForce RTX 5060	May; 19, 2025	GB206-250-A1	21.9	181.0	PCIe; 5 x8	2280 (2497)	1750 (28.0)	3840:120:48: 30:120:30	128	32	8	GDDR7	128	448.0	109.44 (119.86)	273.60 (299.64)	17.510 (19.177)		0.274 (0.300)	70.042 (76.708)	140.083 (153.416)	280.166 (306.831)	560.333 (613.663)	~53.0 (~58.0)	145	$299	—N/a
GeForce RTX 5060 Ti	April; 16, 2025	GB206-300-A1	21.9	181.0	PCIe; 5 x8	2407 (2572)	1750 (28.0)	4608:144:48: 36:144:36	128	32	8	GDDR7	128	448.0	115.54 (123.46)	346.61 (370.37)	22.183 (23.704)		0.347 (0.370)	88.732 (94.814)	177.463 (189.628)	354.927 (379.257)	709.853 (758.514)	~67.4 (~72.0)	180	$379	—N/a
GeForce RTX 5060 Ti 16 GB	April; 16, 2025	GB206-300-A1	21.9	181.0	PCIe; 5 x8	2407 (2572)	1750 (28.0)	4608:144:48: 36:144:36	128	32	16	GDDR7	128	448.0	115.54 (123.46)	346.61 (370.37)	22.183 (23.704)		0.347 (0.370)	88.732 (94.814)	177.463 (189.628)	354.927 (379.257)	709.853 (758.514)	~67.4 (~72.0)	180	$429	—N/a
GeForce RTX 5070	March; 4, 2025	GB205-300-A1	31.1	263.0	PCIe; 5 x16	2325 (2512)	1750 (28.0)	6144:192:80: 48:192:48	128	48	12	GDDR7	192	672.0	186.00 (200.96)	446.40 (482.30)	28.430 (30.717)		0.446 (0.482)	114.278 (123.470)	228.557 (246.940)	457.114 (493.879)	914.227 (987.759)	~87.0 (~94.0)	250	$549	
GeForce RTX 5070 Ti	February; 20, 2025	GB203-300-A1	45.6	378.0	PCIe; 5 x16	2295 (2452)	1750 (28.0)	8960:280:96: 70:280:70	128	48	16	GDDR7	256	896.0	220.32 (235.39)	642.60 (686.56)	41.126 (43.940)		0.643 (0.687)	164.506 (175.759)	329.011 (351.519)	658.022 (703.037)	1,316.045 (1,406.075)	~124.5 (~133.0)	300	$749	—N/a
GeForce RTX 5080	January; 30, 2025	GB203-400-A1	45.6	378.0	PCIe; 5 x16	2295 (2617)	1875 (30.0)	10752:336:112: 84:336:84	128	64	16	GDDR7	256	960.0	257.04 (293.10)	771.12 (879.31)	49.352 (56.276)		0.771 (0.879)	197.407 (225.104)	394.813 (450.208)	789.627 (900.415)	1,579.254 (1,800.831)	~150.0 (~171.0)	360	$999	
GeForce RTX 5090 D	January; 30, 2025	GB202-250-A1	92.2	750.0	PCIe; 5 x16	2017 (2407)	1750 (28.0)	21760:680:176: 170:680:170	128	96	32	GDDR7	512	1,792.0	354.99 (423.63)	1,372.56; 1,636.76	87.780 (104.753)		1.373 (1.637)	351.119 (419.011)	702.239 (838.021)	1,404.477 (1,676.042)	2,375.000 (2,375.000) (Note: The 5090D & 5090D V2 GPUs are limited to a maximum of 2,375 AI TFLOPS, it is speculated this is achieved through a firmware or bios program. It has also been reported when crypto mining or AI workloads are detected, performance for these tasks can be throttled or locked. Gaming performance is not sacrificed.)	~266.1 (~317.5)	575	CN¥16,499 (USD $2,299)	
GeForce RTX 5090 D V2	August; 15, 2025	GB202-240-K1-A1	92.2	750.0	PCIe; 5 x16	2017 (2407)	1750 (28.0)	21760:680:176: 170:680:170	128	96	24	GDDR7	384	1,344.0	354.99 (423.63)	1,372.56; 1,636.76	87.780 (104.753)		1.373 (1.637)	351.119 (419.011)	702.239 (838.021)	1,404.477 (1,676.042)	2,375.000 (2,375.000)	~266.1 (~317.5)	575	CN¥16,499 (USD $2,299)	
GeForce RTX 5090	January; 30, 2025	GB202-300	92.2	750.0	PCIe; 5 x16	2017 (2407)	1750 (28.0)	21760:680:176: 170:680:170	128	96	32	GDDR7	512	1,792.0	354.99 (423.63)	1,372.56; 1,636.76	87.780 (104.753)		1.373 (1.637)	351.119 (419.011)	702.239 (838.021)	1,404.477 (1,676.042)	2,808.955 (3,352.084)	~266.1 (~317.5)	575	$1,999	

== Mobile GPUs ==
Mobile GPUs are either soldered to the mainboard or to some Mobile PCI Express Module (MXM).

=== GeForce2 Go series ===
- All models are manufactured with a 180 nm manufacturing process
- All models support Direct3D 7.0 and OpenGL 1.2
- Celsius (microarchitecture)

Model	Launch	Code name	Bus interface	Core clock (MHz)	Memory clock (MHz)	Core config (Note: Pixel shaders: vertex shaders: texture mapping units: render output units)	Memory				Fillrate			
Model	Launch	Code name	Bus interface	Core clock (MHz)	Memory clock (MHz)	Core config	Size (MiB)	Bandwidth (GB/s)	Bus type	Bus width (bit)	MOperations/s	MPixels/s	MTexels/s	MVertices/s
GeForce2 Go 100	February 6, 2001	NV11M	AGP 4x	125	332	2:0:4:2	8, 16	1.328	DDR	32	250	250	500	0
GeForce2 Go	November 11, 2000	NV11M	AGP 4x	143	166; 332	2:0:4:2	16, 32	2.656	SDR; DDR	128; 64	286	286	572	0
GeForce2 Go 200	February 6, 2001	NV11M	AGP 4x	143	332	2:0:4:2	16, 32	2.656	DDR	64	286	286	572	0

=== GeForce4 Go series ===
- All models are made via 150 nm fabrication process

Model	Launch	Code name	Bus interface	Core clock (MHz)	Memory clock (MHz)	Core config (Note: Pixel shaders: vertex shaders: texture mapping units: render output units)	Memory				Fillrate				API support	
Model	Launch	Code name	Bus interface	Core clock (MHz)	Memory clock (MHz)	Core config	Size (MiB)	Bandwidth (GB/s)	Bus type	Bus width (bit)	MOperations/s	MPixels/s	MTexels/s	MVertices/s	Direct3D	OpenGL
GeForce4 Go 410	February 6, 2002	NV17M	AGP 8x	200	200	2:0:4:2	16	1.6	SDR	64	400	400	800	0	7.0	1.2
GeForce4 Go 420	February 6, 2002	NV17M	AGP 8x	200	400	2:0:4:2	32	3.2	DDR	64	400	400	800	0	7.0	1.2
GeForce4 Go 440	February 6, 2002	NV17M	AGP 8x	220	440	2:0:4:2	64	7.04	DDR	128	440	440	880	0	7.0	1.2
GeForce4 Go 460	October 14, 2002	NV17M	AGP 8x	250	500	2:0:4:2	64	8	DDR	128	500	500	1000	0	7.0	1.2
GeForce4 Go 488		NV18M	AGP 8x	300	550	2:0:4:2	64	8.8	DDR	128	600	600	1200	0	7.0	1.2
GeForce4 Go 4200	November 14, 2002	NV28M	AGP 8x	200	400	4:2:8:4	64	6.4	DDR	128	800	800	1600	100	8.1	1.3

=== GeForce FX Go 5 (Go 5xxx) series ===
The GeForce FX Go 5 series for notebooks architecture.

- ^{1} Vertex shaders: pixel shaders: texture mapping units: render output units
- ^{*} The GeForce FX series runs vertex shaders in an array
- ^{**} GeForce FX series has limited OpenGL 2.1 support(with the last Windows XP driver released for it, 175.19).
- Rankine (microarchitecture)

Model	Launch	Code name	Fab (nm)	Bus interface	Core clock (MHz)	Memory clock (MHz)	Core config^{1}	Memory				Fillrate		Supported API version			TDP (Watts)
Model	Launch	Code name	Fab (nm)	Bus interface	Core clock (MHz)	Memory clock (MHz)	Core config^{1}	Size (MiB)	Bandwidth (GB/s)	Bus type	Bus width (bit)	Pixel (GP/s)	Texture (GT/s)	Direct3D	OpenGL		TDP (Watts)
Model	Launch	Code name	Fab (nm)	Bus interface	Core clock (MHz)	Memory clock (MHz)	Core config^{1}	Size (MiB)	Bandwidth (GB/s)	Bus type	Bus width (bit)	Pixel (GP/s)	Texture (GT/s)		Hardware	Drivers (Software)	TDP (Watts)
GeForce FX Go 5100^{*}	March 2003	NV34M	150	AGP 8x	200	400	4:2:4:4	64	3.2	DDR	64	0.8	0.8	9.0	1.5	2.1**	Unknown
GeForce FX Go 5500^{*}	March 2003	NV34M	150	AGP 8x	300	600	4:2:4:4	32; 64	9.6	DDR	128	1.2	1.2	9.0	1.5	2.1**	Unknown
GeForce FX Go 5600^{*}	March 2003	NV31M	130	AGP 8x	350	600	4:2:4:4	32	9.6	DDR	128	1.4	1.4	9.0	1.5	2.1**	Unknown
GeForce FX Go 5650^{*}	March 2003	NV31M	130	AGP 8x	350	600	4:2:4:4	32	9.6	DDR	128	1.4	1.4	9.0	1.5	2.1**	Unknown
GeForce FX Go 5700^{*}	February 1, 2005	NV36M	130	AGP 8x	450	550	4:3:4:4	32	8.8	DDR	128	1.8	1.8	9.0	1.5	2.1**	Unknown

=== GeForce Go 6 (Go 6xxx) series ===
- All models support Direct3D 9.0c and OpenGL 2.1
- Curie (microarchitecture)

Model	Launch	Code name	Fab (nm)	Bus interface	Core clock (MHz)	Memory clock (MHz)	Core config^{1}	Memory				Fillrate			
Model	Launch	Code name	Fab (nm)	Bus interface	Core clock (MHz)	Memory clock (MHz)	Core config^{1}	Size (MiB)	Bandwidth (GB/s)	Bus type	Bus width (bit)	MOperations/s	MPixels/s	MTexels/s	MVertices/s
GeForce Go 6100 + nForce Go 430	Unknown	C51M	110	HyperTransport	425	System memory	2:1:2:1	Up to 128 MiB system	System memory	DDR2	64/128	850	425	850	106.25
GeForce Go 6150 + nForce Go 430	February 1, 2006	C51M	110	HyperTransport	425	System memory	2:1:2:1	Up to 128 MiB system	System memory	DDR2	64/128	850	425	850	106.25
GeForce Go 6200	February 1, 2006	NV44M	110	PCIe x16	300	600	4:3:4:2	16	2.4	DDR	32	1200	600	1200	225
GeForce Go 6400	February 1, 2006	NV44M	110	PCIe x16	400	700	4:3:4:2	16	5.6	DDR	64	1600	800	1600	250
GeForce Go 6600	September 29, 2005	NV43M	110	PCIe x16	300	700	8:3:8:4	128	11.2	DDR	128	3000	1500	3000	281.25
GeForce Go 6800	November 8, 2004	NV41M	130	PCIe x16	300	700; 1100	12:5:12:12	128	22.4; 35.2	DDR, DDR2; DDR3	256	3000	1500	3000	375
GeForce Go 6800 Ultra	February 24, 2005	NV41M	130	PCIe x16	450	700; 1100	12:5:12:12	256	22.4; 35.2	DDR, DDR2; DDR3	256	5400	3600	5400	562.5

- ^{1} Pixel shaders: vertex shaders: texture mapping units: render output units

=== GeForce Go 7 (Go 7xxx) series ===
The GeForce Go 7 series for notebooks architecture.

- ^{1} Vertex shaders: pixel shaders: texture mapping units: render output units
- ^{2} Graphics card supports TurboCache, memory size entries in bold indicate total memory (graphics + system RAM), otherwise entries are graphics RAM only
- Curie (microarchitecture)

Model	Launch	Code name	Fab (nm)	Bus interface	Core clock (MHz)	Memory clock (MHz)	Core config^{1}	Memory				Fillrate		Supported API version		TDP (Watts)	Features
Model	Launch	Code name	Fab (nm)	Bus interface	Core clock (MHz)	Memory clock (MHz)	Core config^{1}	Size (MiB)	Bandwidth (GB/s)	Bus type	Bus width (bit)	Pixel (GP/s)	Texture (GT/s)	Direct3D	OpenGL	TDP (Watts)	Features
GeForce 7000M	February 1, 2006	MCP67MV	90	Hyper Transport	350	System memory	1:2:2:2	Up to 256 from system memory	System memory	DDR2	64/128	0.7	0.7	9.0c	2.1	Unknown	
GeForce 7150M	February 1, 2006	MCP67M	90	Hyper Transport	425	System memory	1:2:2:2	Up to 256 from system memory	System memory	DDR2	64/128	0.85	0.85	9.0c	2.1	Unknown	
GeForce Go 7200^{2}	January 2006	G72M	90	PCIe x16	450	700	3:4:4:1	64	2.8	GDDR3	32	0.45	1.8	9.0c	2.1	Unknown	Transparency Anti-Aliasing
GeForce Go 7300^{2}	January 2006	G72M	90	PCIe x16	350	700	3:4:4:2	128, 256, **512**	5.60	GDDR3	64	0.7	1.4	9.0c	2.1	Unknown	Transparency Anti-Aliasing
GeForce Go 7400^{2}	January 2006	G72M	90	PCIe x16	450	900	3:4:4:2	64, **256**	7.20	GDDR3	64	0.9	1.8	9.0c	2.1	Unknown	Transparency Anti-Aliasing
GeForce Go 7600	March 2006	G73M	90	PCIe x16	450	1000	5:8:8:8	256, 512	16	GDDR3	128	3.6	3.6	9.0c	2.1	Unknown	Scalable Link Interface (SLI), Transparency Anti-Aliasing
GeForce Go 7600 GT	2006	G73M	90	PCIe x16	500	1200	5:12:12:8	256	19.2	GDDR3	128	4	6	9.0c	2.1	Unknown	Scalable Link Interface (SLI), Transparency Anti-Aliasing
GeForce Go 7700	2006	G73-N-B1	80	PCIe x16	450	1000	5:12:12:8	512	16	GDDR3	128	3.6	5.4	9.0c	2.1	Unknown	Scalable Link Interface (SLI), Transparency Anti-Aliasing
GeForce Go 7800	March 3, 2006	G70M	110	PCIe x16	400	1100	6:16:16:8	256	35.2	GDDR3	256	3.2	6.4	9.0c	2.1	35	Scalable Link Interface (SLI), Transparency Anti-Aliasing
GeForce Go 7800 GTX	October 2005	G70M	110	PCIe x16	400	1100	8:24:24:16	256	35.2	GDDR3	256	6.4	9.6	9.0c	2.1	65	Scalable Link Interface (SLI), Transparency Anti-Aliasing
GeForce Go 7900 GS	April 2006	G71M	90	PCIe x16	375	1000	7:20:20:16	256	32.0	GDDR3	256	6	7.5	9.0c	2.1	20	Scalable Link Interface (SLI), Transparency Anti-Aliasing
GeForce Go 7900 GTX	April 2006	G71M	90	PCIe x16	500	1200	8:24:24:16	256 512	38.4	GDDR3	256	8	12	9.0c	2.1	45	Scalable Link Interface (SLI), Transparency Anti-Aliasing
GeForce Go 7950 GTX	October 2006	G71M	90	PCIe x16	575	1400	8:24:24:16	512	44.8	GDDR3	256	9.2	13.8	9.0c	2.1	45	Scalable Link Interface (SLI), Transparency Anti-Aliasing

=== GeForce 8M (8xxxM) series ===
The GeForce 8M series for notebooks architecture Tesla.

- ^{1} Unified shaders: texture mapping units: render output units

Model	Launch	Code name	Fab (nm)	Bus interface	Clock speed			Core config^{1}	Memory				Fillrate		Processing power (GFLOPS)	Supported API version		TDP (Watts)	Notes
Model	Launch	Code name	Fab (nm)	Bus interface	Core (MHz)	Shader (MHz)	Memory (MHz)	Core config^{1}	Size (MiB)	Bandwidth (GB/s)	Bus type	Bus width (bit)	Pixel (GP/s)	Texture (GT/s)	Processing power (GFLOPS)	Direct3D	OpenGL	TDP (Watts)	Notes
GeForce 8200M G	June 2008	MCP77MV, MCP79MVL	80	Integrated (PCIe 2.0 x16)	400	800	800; 1066 (system memory)	8:8:4	Up to 256 from system memory	12.8; 17.056	DDR2; DDR3	128	1.6	3.2	19.2	10.0	3.3	Unknown	PureVideo HD with VP3, Full H.264 / VC-1 / MPEG-2 HW Decode
GeForce 8400M G	May 2007	NB8M(G86)	80	PCIe x16	400	800	800	8:8:4	128 / 256	6.4	DDR2 / GDDR3	64	1.6	3.2		10.0	3.3	10	PureVideo HD with VP2, BSP Engine, and AES128 Engine
GeForce 8400M GS	May 2007	NB8M(G86)	80	PCIe x16	400	800	800	16:8:4	128 / 256	6.4	DDR2 / GDDR3	64	1.6	3.2	38.4	10.0	3.3	11	PureVideo HD with VP2, BSP Engine, and AES128 Engine
GeForce 8400M GT	May 2007	NB8M(G86)	80	PCIe x16	450	900	1200	16:8:4	256 / 512	19.2	DDR2 / GDDR3	128	1.8	3.6	43.2	10.0	3.3	14	PureVideo HD with VP2, BSP Engine, and AES128 Engine
GeForce 8600M GS	May 2007	NB8P(G84)	80	PCIe x16	600	1200	1400	16:8:4	256 / 512	22.4	DDR2 / GDDR3	128	2.4	4.8	57.6	10.0	3.3	20	PureVideo HD with VP2, BSP Engine, and AES128 Engine
GeForce 8600M GT	May 2007	NB8P(G84)	80	PCIe x16	475	950	800 / 1400	32:16:8	256 / 512	12.8 / 22.4	DDR2 / GDDR3	128	3.8	7.6	91.2	10.0	3.3	20	PureVideo HD with VP2, BSP Engine, and AES128 Engine
GeForce 8700M GT	June 2007	NB8P(G84)	80	PCIe x16	625	1250	1600	32:16:8	256 / 512	25.6	GDDR3	128	5	10	120	10.0	3.3	29	Scalable Link Interface, PureVideo HD with VP2, BSP Engine, and AES128 Engine
GeForce 8800M GTS	November 2007	NB8P(G92)	65	PCIe 2.0 x16	500	1250	1600	64:32:16	512	51.2	GDDR3	256	8	16	240	10.0	3.3	50	Scalable Link Interface, PureVideo HD with VP2, BSP Engine, and AES128 Engine
GeForce 8800M GTX	November 2007	NB8P(G92)	65	PCIe 2.0 x16	500	1250	1600	96:48:16	512	51.2	GDDR3	256	8	24	360	10.0	3.3	65	Scalable Link Interface, PureVideo HD with VP2, BSP Engine, and AES128 Engine

=== GeForce 9M (9xxxM) series ===
The GeForce 9M series for notebooks architecture. Tesla (microarchitecture)

- ^{1} Unified shaders: texture mapping units: render output units

Model	Launch	Code name	Fab (nm)	Bus interface	Clock speed			Core config^{1}	Memory				Fillrate		Processing power (GFLOPS)	Supported API version		TDP (Watts)	Notes
Model	Launch	Code name	Fab (nm)	Bus interface	Core (MHz)	Shader (MHz)	Memory (MHz)	Core config^{1}	Size (MiB)	Bandwidth (GB/s)	Bus type	Bus width (bit)	Pixel (GP/s)	Texture (GT/s)	Processing power (GFLOPS)	Direct3D	OpenGL	TDP (Watts)	Notes
GeForce 9100M G mGPU	2008	MCP77MH, MCP79MH	65	Integrated (PCIe 2.0 x16)	450	1100	1066 (system memory)	8:8:4	Up to 256 from system memory	17.056	DDR3	128	1.8	3.6	26.4	10.0	3.3	12	Similar to 8400M G
GeForce 9200M GS	2008	NB9M-GE(G98)	65	PCIe 2.0 x16	550	1300	1400	8:8:4	256	11.2	DDR2/GDDR3	64	2.2	4.4	31.2	10.0	3.3	13	
GeForce 9300M G	2008	NB9M-GE(G86)	80	PCIe 2.0 x16	400	800	1200	16:8:4	256/512	9.6	DDR2/GDDR3	64	1.6	3.2	38.4	10.0	3.3	13	
GeForce 9300M GS	2008	NB9M-GE(G98)	65	PCIe 2.0 x16	550	1400	1400	8:8:4	256/512	11.2	DDR2/GDDR3	64	2.2	4.4	33.6	10.0	3.3	13	
GeForce 9400M G	October 15, 2008	MCP79MX	65	Integrated(PCIe 2.0 x16)	450	1100	800; 1066 (system memory)	16:8:4	Up to 256 from system memory	12.8; 17.056	DDR2; DDR3	128	1.8	3.6	54	10.0	3.3	12	PureVideo HD with VP3. Known as the GeForce 9400M in Apple systems and Nvidia ION based systems
GeForce 9500M G	2008	NB9P(G96)	65	PCIe 2.0 x16	500	1250	1600	16:8:8	512	25.6	DDR2 / GDDR3	128	4	4	60	10.0	3.3	20	
GeForce 9500M GS	2008	NB9P-GV(G96)	80	PCIe x16	475	950	1400	32:16:8	512	22.4	DDR2 / GDDR3	128	3.8	7.6	91.2	10.0	3.3	20	Rebranded 8600M GT
GeForce 9600M GS	2008	NB9P-GE2(G96)	65	PCIe 2.0 x16	430	1075	800; 1600	32:16:8	1024	12.8; 25.6	DDR2 / GDDR3	128	3.44	6.88	103.2	10.0	3.3	20	
GeForce 9600M GT	2008	NB9P-GS(G96)	65	PCIe 2.0 x16	500	1250	1600	32:16:8	512/1024	25.6	DDR2 / GDDR3	128	4	8	120	10.0	3.3	23	
GeForce 9650M GS	2008	NB9P-GS1(G84)	80	PCIe 2.0 x16	625	1250	1600	32:16:8	512	25.6	GDDR3	128	5	10	120	10.0	3.3	29	Rebranded 8700M GT
GeForce 9650M GT	2008	NB9P-GT(G96)	65/55	PCIe 2.0 x16	550	1325	1600	32:16:8	1024	25.6	GDDR3	128	4.4	8.8	127.2	10.0	3.3	23	
GeForce 9700M GT	July 29, 2008	NB9E-GE(G96)	65	PCIe x16	625	1550	1600	32:16:8	512	25.6	GDDR3	128	5	10	148.8	10.0	3.3	45	
GeForce 9700M GTS	July 29, 2008	NB9E-GS(G94)	65	PCIe 2.0 x16	530	1325	1600	48:24:16	512	51.2	GDDR3	256	8.48	12.7	190.8	10.0	3.3	60	
GeForce 9800M GS	2008	NB9E-GT(G94)	65	PCIe 2.0 x16	530	1325	1600	64:32:16	512	51.2	GDDR3	256	8.48	16.96	254	10.0	3.3	60	Down Clocked 9800M GTS Via Firmware
GeForce 9800M GTS	July 29, 2008	NB9E-GT(G94)	65/55	PCIe 2.0 x16	600	1500	1600	64:32:16	512 / 1024	51.2	GDDR3	256	9.6	19.2	288	10.0	3.3	75	
GeForce 9800M GT	July 29, 2008	NB9E-GT2(G92)	65/55	PCIe 2.0 x16	500	1250	1600	96:48:16	512	51.2	GDDR3	256	8	24	360	10.0	3.3	65	Rebranded 8800M GTX
GeForce 9800M GTX	July 29, 2008	NB9E-GTX(G92)	65	PCIe 2.0 x16	500	1250	1600	112:56:16	1024	51.2	GDDR3	256	8	28	420	10.0	3.3	75	
Model	Launch	Code name	Fab (nm)	Bus interface	Core (MHz)	Shader (MHz)	Memory (MHz)	Core config^{1}	Size (MiB)	Bandwidth (GB/s)	Bus type	Bus width (bit)	Pixel (GP/s)	Texture (GT/s)	Processing power (GFLOPS)	Direct3D	OpenGL	TDP (Watts)	Notes
Model	Launch	Code name	Fab (nm)	Bus interface	Clock speed			Core config^{1}	Memory				Fillrate		Processing power (GFLOPS)	Supported API version		TDP (Watts)	Notes

=== GeForce 100M (1xxM) series ===
The GeForce 100M series for notebooks architecture. Tesla (microarchitecture) (103M, 105M, 110M, 130M are rebranded GPU i.e. using the same GPU cores of previous generation, 9M, with promised optimisation on other features)

- ^{1} Unified shaders: texture mapping units: render output units

Model	Launch	Code name	Fab (nm)	Bus interface	Clock speed			Core config^{1}	Memory				Fillrate		Processing power (GFLOPS)	Supported API version		TDP (Watts)	Notes
Model	Launch	Code name	Fab (nm)	Bus interface	Core (MHz)	Shader (MHz)	Memory (MHz)	Core config^{1}	Size (MiB)	Bandwidth (GB/s)	Bus type	Bus width (bit)	Pixel (GP/s)	Texture (GT/s)	Processing power (GFLOPS)	Direct3D	OpenGL	TDP (Watts)	Notes
GeForce G 102M	January 8, 2009	MCP79XT	65	Integrated (PCIe 1.0 x16)	450?	1000	800 (system memory)	16:8:4	Up to 512 from system memory	6.4	DDR2	64	1.8	3.6	48	10.0	3.3	14	PureVideo HD, CUDA, Hybrid SLI, based on GeForce 9400M G
GeForce G 103M	January 1, 2009	N10M-GE2(G98)	65	PCIe 2.0 x16	640	1600	1000	8:8:4	512	8	DDR2	64	2.56	5.12	38	10.0	3.3	14	PureVideo HD, CUDA, Hybrid SLI, comparable to the GeForce 9300M GS
GeForce G 105M	January 8, 2009	N10M-GE1(G98)	65	PCIe 2.0 x16	640	1600	1000; 1400	8:8:4		8; 11	GDDR2; GDDR3	64	2.56	5.12	38	10.0	3.3	14	PureVideo HD, CUDA, Hybrid SLI, comparable to the GeForce 9300M GS
GeForce G 110M	January 8, 2009	N10M-GE1(G96b)	55	PCIe 2.0 x16	400	1000	1000; 1400	16:8:4	1024	8; 11	DDR2; GDDR3	64	1.6	3.2	48	10.0	3.3	14	PureVideo HD, CUDA, Hybrid SLI
GeForce GT 120M	February 11, 2009	N10P-GV1(G96b)	55	PCIe 2.0 x16	500	1250	1000	32:16:8	1024	16	DDR2	128	4	8	110	10.0	3.3	23	PureVideo HD, CUDA, Hybrid SLI, Comparable to the 9500M GT and 9600M GT DDR2 (500/1250/400)
GeForce GT 130M	January 8, 2009	N10P-GE1(G96b)	55	PCIe 2.0 x16	600	1500	1000; 1600	32:16:8	1024	16; 25.6	DDR2; GDDR3	128	4.8	9.6	144	10.0	3.3	23	PureVideo HD, CUDA, Hybrid SLI, comparable to the 9650M GT
GeForce GTS 150M	March 3, 2009	N10E-GE1(G94b)	55	PCIe 2.0 x16	400	1000	1600	64:32:16	1024	51.2	GDDR3	256	6.4	12.8	192	10.0	3.3	Unknown	PureVideo HD, CUDA, Hybrid SLI
GeForce GTS 160M	March 3, 2009	N10E-GS1(G94b)	55	PCIe 2.0 x16	600	1500	1600	64:32:16	1024	51.2	GDDR3	256	9.6	19.2	288	10.0	3.3	60	PureVideo HD, CUDA, Hybrid SLI

=== GeForce 200M (2xxM) series ===
The GeForce 200M series is a graphics processor architecture for notebooks, Tesla (microarchitecture)

- ^{1} Unified shaders: texture mapping units: render output units

Model	Launch	Code name	Fab (nm)	Bus interface	Clock speed			Core config^{1}	Memory				Fillrate		Processing power (GFLOPS)	Supported API version		TDP (Watts)	Notes
Model	Launch	Code name	Fab (nm)	Bus interface	Core (MHz)	Shader (MHz)	Memory (MHz)	Core config^{1}	Size (MiB)	Bandwidth (GB/s)	Bus type	Bus width (bit)	Pixel (GP/s)	Texture (GT/s)	Processing power (GFLOPS)	Direct3D	OpenGL	TDP (Watts)	Notes
GeForce G210M	June 15, 2009	GT218	40	PCIe 2.0 x16	625	1500	1600	16:8:4	512	12.8	GDDR3	64	2.5	5	72	10.1	3.3	14	Lower clocked versions of the GT218 core is also known as Nvidia ION 2
GeForce GT 220M	2009	G96b	55	PCIe 2.0 x16	500	1250	1000; 1600	32:16:8	1024	16; 25.6	DDR2; GDDR3	128	4	8	120	10.1	3.3	14	rebranded 9600M GT @55 nm node shrink
GeForce GT 230M	June 15, 2009	GT216	40	PCIe 2.0 x16	500	1100	1600	48:16:8	1024	25.6	GDDR3	128	4	8	158	10.1	3.3	23	
GeForce GT 240M	June 15, 2009	GT216	40	PCIe 2.0 x16	550	1210	1600	48:16:8	1024	25.6	GDDR3	128	4.4	8.8	174	10.1	3.3	23	
GeForce GTS 250M	June 15, 2009	GT215	40	PCIe 2.0 x16	500	1250	3200	96:32:8	1024	51.2	GDDR5	128	4	16	360	10.1	3.3	28	
GeForce GTS 260M	June 15, 2009	GT215	40	PCIe 2.0 x16	550	1375	3600	96:32:8	1024	57.6	GDDR5	128	4.4	17.6	396	10.1	3.3	38	
GeForce GTX 260M	March 3, 2009	G92b	55	PCIe 2.0 x16	550	1375	1900	112:56:16	1024	60.8	GDDR3	256	8.8	30.8	462	10.1	3.3	65	
GeForce GTX 280M	March 3, 2009	G92b	55	PCIe 2.0 x16	585	1463	1900	128:64:16	1024	60.8	GDDR3	256	9.36	37.44	562	10.1	3.3	75	
GeForce GTX 285M	February 2010	G92b	55	PCIe 2.0 x16	600	1500	2000	128:64:16	1024	64.0	GDDR3	256	9.6	38.4	576	10.1	3.3	75	Higher Clocked Version of GTX280M with new memory

=== GeForce 300M (3xxM) series ===
The GeForce 300M series for notebooks architecture, Tesla (microarchitecture)

- ^{1} Unified shaders: texture mapping units: render output units
- ^{2} To calculate the processing power see Tesla (microarchitecture)#Performance.

Model	Launch	Code name	Fab (nm)	Bus interface	Clock speed			Core config^{1}	Memory				Fillrate		Processing power (GFLOPS)^{2}	Supported API version		TDP (Watts)
Model	Launch	Code name	Fab (nm)	Bus interface	Core (MHz)	Shader (MHz)	Memory (MHz)	Core config^{1}	Size (MiB)	Bandwidth (GB/s)	Bus type	Bus width (bit)	Pixel (GP/s)	Texture (GT/s)	Processing power (GFLOPS)^{2}	Direct3D	OpenGL	TDP (Watts)
GeForce 305M	January 10, 2010	GT218	40	PCIe 2.0 x16	525	1150	1400	16:8:4	512	11.2	DDR3; GDDR3	64	2.1	4.2	55	10.1	3.3	14
GeForce 310M	January 10, 2010	GT218	40	PCIe 2.0 x16	625	1530	1600	16:8:4	512	12.8	DDR3; GDDR3	64	2.5	5	73	10.1	3.3	14
GeForce 315M	January 5, 2011	GT218	40	PCIe 2.0 x16	606	1212	1600	16:8:4	512	12.8	DDR3; GDDR3	64	2.42	4.85	58.18	10.1	3.3	14
GeForce 320M	April 1, 2010	MCP89	40	PCIe 2.0 x16	450	950	1066	48:16:8	256 (shared w/ system memory)	17.056	DDR3	128	3.6	7.2	136.8	10.1	3.3	20
GeForce GT 320M	January 21, 2010	GT216	40	PCIe 2.0 x16	500	1100	1580	24:8:8	1024	25.3	DDR3; GDDR3	128	4	4	90	10.1	3.3	14
GeForce GT 325M	January 10, 2010	GT216	40	PCIe 2.0 x16	450	990	1600	48:16:8	1024	25.6	DDR3; GDDR3	128	3.6	7.2	142	10.1	3.3	23
GeForce GT 330M	January 10, 2010	GT216	40	PCIe 2.0 x16	575	1265	1600	48:16:8	1024	25.6	DDR3; GDDR3	128	4.6	9.2	182	10.1	3.3	23
GeForce GT 335M	January 7, 2010	GT215	40	PCIe 2.0 x16	450	1080	1600	72:24:8	1024	25.6	DDR3; GDDR3	128	3.6	10.8	233	10.1	3.3	28?
GeForce GTS 350M	January 7, 2010	GT215	40	PCIe 2.0 x16	500	1249	3200	96:32:8	1024	51.2	DDR3; GDDR3; GDDR5	128	4	16	360	10.1	3.3	28
GeForce GTS 360M	January 7, 2010	GT215	40	PCIe 2.0 x16	500	1436	3600	96:32:8	1024	57.6	DDR3; GDDR3; GDDR5	128	4.4	17.6	413	10.1	3.3	38

=== GeForce 400M (4xxM) series ===
The GeForce 400M series for notebooks architecture, Fermi (microarchitecture)

- ^{1} Unified shaders: texture mapping units: render output units
- ^{2} To calculate the processing power see Fermi (microarchitecture)#Performance.
- ^{3} Each SM in the GF100 also contains 4 texture address units and 16 texture filtering units. Total for the full GF100 64 texture address units and 256 texture filtering units. Each SM in the GF104/106/108 architecture contains 8 texture filtering units for every texture address unit. The complete GF104 die contains 64 texture address units and 512 texture filtering units, the complete GF106 die contains 32 texture address units and 256 texture filtering units and the complete GF108 die contains 16 texture address units and 128 texture filtering units.

Model	Launch	Code name	Fab (nm)	Bus interface	Clock speed			Core config^{1}	Memory				Fillrate		Processing power (GFLOPS)^{2}	Supported API version		TDP (Watts)	Notes
Model	Launch	Code name	Fab (nm)	Bus interface	Core (MHz)	Shader (MHz)	Memory (MHz)	Core config^{1}	Size (GiB)	Bandwidth (GB/s)	Bus type	Bus width (bit)	Pixel (GP/s)	Texture (GT/s)	Processing power (GFLOPS)^{2}	Direct3D	OpenGL	TDP (Watts)	Notes
GeForce 410M	January 5, 2011	GF119	40	PCIe 2.0 x16	575	1150	1600	48:8^{3}:4	0.5 and 1	12.8	DDR3	64	2.3	4.6	110.4	12	4.5	12	Similar to Desktop GT420 OEM
GeForce GT 415M	September 3, 2010	GF108	40	PCIe 2.0 x16	500	1000	1600	48:8^{3}:4	0.5 and 1	25.6	DDR3	128	2	4	96	12	4.5	<12(GPU only)	Similar to Desktop GT420 OEM
GeForce GT 420M	September 3, 2010	GF108	40	PCIe 2.0 x16	500	1000	1600	96:16^{3}:4	0.5 and 1	25.6	DDR3	128	2	8	192	12	4.5	10–23(GPU only)	Similar to Desktop GT430
GeForce GT 425M	September 3, 2010	GF108	40	PCIe 2.0 x16	560	1120	1600	96:16^{3}:4	1	25.6	DDR3	128	2.24	8.96	215.04	12	4.5	20–23(GPU only)	Similar to Desktop GT430
GeForce GT 435M	September 3, 2010	GF108	40	PCIe 2.0 x16	650	1300	1600	96:16^{3}:4	2	25.6	DDR3	128	2.6	10.4	249.6	12	4.5	32–35(GPU only)	Similar to Desktop GT430/440
GeForce GT 445M	September 3, 2010	GF106	40	PCIe 2.0 x16	590	1180	1600; 2500	144:24^{3}:16; 144:24^{3}:24	1; 1.5	25.6; 60	DDR3; GDDR5	128; 192	9.44; 14.16	14.16	339.84	12	4.5	30–35(GPU only)	Similar to Desktop GTS450 OEM)
GeForce GTX 460M	September 3, 2010	GF106	40	PCIe 2.0 x16	675	1350	2500	192:32^{3}:24	1.5	60	GDDR5	192	16.2	21.6	518.4	12	4.5	45–50(GPU only)	Similar to Desktop GTX550 Ti
GeForce GTX 470M	September 3, 2010	GF104	40	PCIe 2.0 x16	550	1100	2500	288:48^{3}:24	1.5	60	GDDR5	192	13.2	26.4	633.6	12	4.5	45–50(GPU only)	Similar to Desktop GTX 460/560SE
GeForce GTX 480M	May 25, 2010	GF100	40	PCIe 2.0 x16	425	850	2400	352:44^{3}:32	2	76.8	GDDR5	256	13.6	18.7	598.4	12	4.5	100(MXM module)	Similar to Desktop GTX465
GeForce GTX 485M	January 5, 2011	GF104	40	PCIe 2.0 x16	575	1150	3000	384:64^{3}:32	2	96.0	GDDR5	256	18.4	36.8	883.2	12	4.5	100(MXM module)	Similar to Desktop GTX560 Ti

=== GeForce 500M (5xxM) series ===
The GeForce 500M series for notebooks architecture, Fermi (microarchitecture)

- ^{1} Unified shaders: texture mapping units: render output units
- ^{2} On Some Dell XPS17

Model	Launch	Code name	Fab (nm)	Bus interface	Clock speed			Core config^{1}	Memory				Fillrate		Processing power (GFLOPS)^{2}	Supported API version		TDP (Watts)	Notes
Model	Launch	Code name	Fab (nm)	Bus interface	Core (MHz)	Shader (MHz)	Memory (MHz)	Core config^{1}	Size (GiB)	Bandwidth (GB/s)	Bus type	Bus width (bit)	Pixel (GP/s)	Texture (GT/s)	Processing power (GFLOPS)^{2}	Direct3D	OpenGL	TDP (Watts)	Notes
GeForce GT 520M	January 5, 2011	GF119	40	PCIe 2.0 x16	740	1480	1600	48:8:4	1	12.8	DDR3	64	2.96	5.92	142.08	12	4.6	12	Similar to Desktop 510/520
GeForce GT 520M		GF108	40	PCIe 2.0 x16	515	1030	1600	96:16:4	1	12.8	DDR3	64	2.06	8.24	197.76	12	4.6	20	Noticed in Lenovo laptops, similar to Desktop 530/430/440
GeForce GT 520MX	May 30, 2011	GF119	40	PCIe 2.0 x16	900	1800	1800	48:8:4	1	14.4	DDR3	64	3.6	7.2	172.8	12	4.6	20	Similar to Desktop 510 & GT520
GeForce GT 525M	January 5, 2011	GF108	40	PCIe 2.0 x16	600	1200	1800	96:16:4	1	28.8	DDR3	128	2.4	9.6	230.4	12	4.6	20–23	Similar to Desktop GT 530/430/440
GeForce GT 540M	January 5, 2011	GF108	40	PCIe 2.0 x16	672	1344	1800	96:16:4	2; 1	28.8	DDR3	128	2.688	10.752	258.048	12	4.6	32–35	Similar to Desktop GT 530/440
GeForce GT 550M	January 5, 2011	GF108; GF106^{2}	40	PCIe 2.0 x16	740; 475	1480; 950	1800; 1800	96:16:4; 144:24:16^{2}	1	28.8	DDR3	128	2.96	11.84	284.16; 312.6	12	4.6	32–35	Similar to Desktop GT 530/440
GeForce GT 555M	January 5, 2011	GF106 GF108	40	PCIe 2.0 x16	590; 650; 753	1180; 1300; 1506	1800; 1800; 3138	144:24:24; 144:24:16; 96:16:4	1.5; 2; 1	43.2; 28.8; 50.2	DDR3; DDR3; GDDR5	192; 128; 128	14.6; 10.4; 3	14.6; 15.6; 12	339.84; 374.4; 289.15	12	4.6	30–35	Similar to Desktop GT545
GeForce GTX 560M	May 30, 2011	GF116	40	PCIe 2.0 x16	775	1550	2500	192:32:16; 192:32:24	2; 1.5, 3	40.0; 60.0	GDDR5	128; 192	18.6	24.8	595.2	12	4.6	75	Similar to Desktop GTX 550Ti
GeForce GTX 570M	June 28, 2011	GF114	40	PCIe 2.0 x16	575	1150	3000	336:56:24	1.5	72.0	GDDR5	192	13.8	32.2	772.8	12	4.6	75	Similar to Desktop GTX 560
GeForce GTX 580M	June 28, 2011	GF114	40	PCIe 2.0 x16	620	1240	3000	384:64:32	2	96.0	GDDR5	256	19.8	39.7	952.3	12	4.6	100	Similar to Desktop GTX 560 Ti

=== GeForce 600M (6xxM) series ===
The GeForce 600M series for notebooks architecture, Fermi (microarchitecture) and Kepler (microarchitecture). The processing power is obtained by multiplying shader clock speed, the number of cores, and how many instructions the cores can perform per cycle.

- ^{1} Unified shaders: texture mapping units: render output units
- Non GTX Graphics, lack support NVENC

Model	Launch	Code name	Fab (nm)	Bus interface	Clock speed			Core config^{1}	Memory				Fillrate		Processing power (GFLOPS)^{2}	Supported API version			TDP (Watts)	Notes
Model	Launch	Code name	Fab (nm)	Bus interface	Core (MHz)	Shader (MHz)	Memory (GT/s)	Core config^{1}	Size (GiB)	Bandwidth (GB/s)	Bus type	Bus width (bit)	Pixel (GP/s)	Texture (GT/s)	Processing power (GFLOPS)^{2}	Vulkan	Direct3D	OpenGL	TDP (Watts)	Notes
GeForce 610M	December 2011	GF119 (N13M-GE)	40	PCIe 2.0 x16	900	1800	1.8	48:8:4	1; 2	14.4	DDR3	64	3.6	7.2	142.08	n/a	12	4.5	12	OEM. Rebadged GT 520MX
GeForce GT 620M	April 2012	GF117 (N13M-GS)	28	PCIe 2.0 x16	625	1250	1.8	96:16:4	1; 2	14.4; 28.8	DDR3	64; 128	2.5	10	240	n/a	12	4.5	15	OEM. Die-Shrink GF108
GeForce GT 625M	October 2012	GF117 (N13M-GS)	28	PCIe 2.0 x16	625	1250	1.8	96:16:4	1; 2	14.4	DDR3	64	2.5	10		n/a	12	4.5	15	OEM. Die-Shrink GF108
GeForce GT 630M	April 2012	GF108 (N13P-GL); GF117	40; 28	PCIe 2.0 x16	660; 800	1320; 1600	1.8; 4	96:16:4	1; 2	28.8; 32.0	DDR3; GDDR5	128; 64	2.6; 3.2	10.7; 12.8	258.0; 307.2	n/a	12	4.5	33	GF108: OEM. Rebadged GT 540M; GF117: OEM Die-Shrink GF108
GeForce GT 635M	April 2012	GF106 (N12E-GE2); GF116	40	PCIe 2.0 x16	675	1350	1.8	144:24:24	2; 1.5	28.8; 43.2	DDR3	128; 192	16.2	16.2	289.2; 388.8	n/a	12	4.5	35	GF106: OEM. Rebadged GT 555M; GF116: 94% of desktop GT640
GeForce GT 640M LE	March 22, 2012	GF108; GK107 (N13P-LP)	40; 28	PCIe 2.0 x16 PCIe 3.0 x16	762; 500	1524; 500	3.13; 1.8	96:16:4 384:32:16 (2 SMX)	1; 2	50.2; 28.8	DDR3 GDDR5	128	3; 8	12.2; 16	292.6; 384	1.2	12	4.5	32; 20	GF108: 94% of desktop GT630; GK107: 47% of desktop GTX650
GeForce GT 640M	March 22, 2012	GK107 (N13P-GS)	28	PCIe 3.0 x16	625	625	1.8; 4	384:32:16 (2 SMX)	1; 2	28.8; 64.0	DDR3 GDDR5	128	10	20	480	1.2	12	4.5	32	59% of desktop GTX650
GeForce GT 645M	October 2012	GK107 (N13P-GS)	28	PCIe 3.0 x16	710	710	1.8; 4	384:32:16 (2 SMX)	1; 2	28.8; 64.0	DDR3 GDDR5	128	11.36	22.72	545	1.2	12	4.5	32	67% of desktop GTX650
GeForce GT 650M	March 22, 2012	GK107 (N13P-GT)	28	PCIe 3.0 x16	745; 835; 900*	835; 950; 900*	1.8; 4; 5*	384:32:16 (2 SMX)	0.5; 1; 2	28.8; 64.0; 80.0*	DDR3 GDDR5	128	11.9; 13.4; 14.4*	23.8; 26.7; 28.8*	729.6; 641.3; 691.2*	1.2	12	4.5	45	79% of desktop GTX650
GeForce GTX 660M	March 22, 2012	GK107 (N13E-GE)	28	PCIe 3.0 x16	835	950	5	384:32:16 (2 SMX)	2	80.0	GDDR5	128	15.2	30.4	729.6	1.2	12	4.5	50	79% of desktop GTX650
GeForce GTX 670M	April 2012	GF114 (N13E-GS1-LP)	40	PCIe 2.0 x16	620	1240	3	336:56:24	1.5; 3	72.0	GDDR5	192	14.35	33.5	833	n/a	12	4.5	75	73% of desktop GTX 560
GeForce GTX 670MX	October 2012	GK104 (N13E-GR)	28	PCIe 3.0 x16	615	615	2.8	960:80:24 (5 SMX)	1.5; 3	67.2	GDDR5	192	14.4	48.0	1181	1.2	12	4.5	75	61% of desktop GTX 660
GeForce GTX 675M	April 2012	GF114 (N13E-GS1)	40	PCIe 2.0 x16	632	1265	3	384:64:32	2	96.0	GDDR5	256	19.8	39.7	972	n/a	12	4.5	100	75% of desktop GTX 560Ti
GeForce GTX 675MX	October 2012	GK104 (N13E-GSR)	28	PCIe 3.0 x16	667	667	3.6	960:80:32 (5 SMX)	4	115.2	GDDR5	256	19.2	48.0	1281	1.2	12	4.5	100	61% of desktop GTX 660
GeForce GTX 680M	June 4, 2012	GK104 (N13E-GTX)	28	PCIe 3.0 x16	719	719	3.6	1344:112:32 (7 SMX)	4	115.2	GDDR5	256	23	80.6	1933	1.2	12	4.5	100	78% of desktop GTX 670
GeForce GTX 680MX	October 23, 2012	GK104	28	PCIe 3.0 x16	719	719	5	1536:128:32 (8 SMX)	4	160	GDDR5	256	23	92.2	2209	1.2	12	4.5	122	72% of desktop GTX 680
Model	Launch	Code name	Fab (nm)	Bus interface	Clock speed			Core config^{1}	Memory				Fillrate		Processing power (GFLOPS)^{2}	Supported API version			TDP (Watts)	Notes
Model	Launch	Code name	Fab (nm)	Bus interface	Core (MHz)	Shader (MHz)	Memory (GT/s)	Core config^{1}	Size (GiB)	Bandwidth (GB/s)	Bus type	Bus width (bit)	Pixel (GP/s)	Texture (GT/s)	Processing power (GFLOPS)^{2}	Vulkan	Direct3D	OpenGL	TDP (Watts)	Notes

=== GeForce 700M (7xxM) series ===
The GeForce 700M series for notebooks architecture. The processing power is obtained by multiplying shader clock speed, the number of cores, and how many instructions the cores can perform per cycle.

- ^{1} Unified shaders: texture mapping units: render output units
- Non GTX variants lack NVENC support

Model	Launch	Code name	Fab (nm)	Bus interface	Clock speed			Core config^{1}	Memory				Fillrate		Processing power (GFLOPS)^{2}	Supported API version				TDP (Watts)	Notes
Model	Launch	Code name	Fab (nm)	Bus interface	Core (MHz)	Shader (MHz)	Memory (GT/s)	Core config^{1}	Size (GiB)	Bandwidth (GB/s)	Bus type	Bus width (bit)	Pixel (GP/s)	Texture (GT/s)	Processing power (GFLOPS)^{2}	Vulkan	Direct3D	OpenGL	CUDA	TDP (Watts)	Notes
GeForce 710M	January 2013	GF117	28	PCIe 2.0 x16	800	1600	1.8	96:16:4	1; 2	14.4	DDR3	64	3.2	12.8	307.2	n/a	12	4.5	2.1	12	OEM. About 115% of Mobile 620 & Desktop 530
GeForce 710M	July 24, 2013	GK208	28	PCIe 3.0 x8	719	?	1.8	192:16:8	1	14.4	DDR3	64	5.752	11.5	276.1	1.2	12	4.5	3.5	15	Kepler, similar to 730M with half of the cores disabled
GeForce GT 720M	April 1, 2013	GF117	28	PCIe 2.0 x16	938	1876	2	96:16:4	2	16.0	DDR3	64	3.8	15.0	360.19	n/a	12	4.5	2.1	?	OEM. About 130% of Mobile 625/630 & Desktop 620
GeForce GT 720M	December 25, 2013	GK208	28	PCIe 2.0 x8	719		2	192:16:8	2	12.8	DDR3	64	3.032	12.13	291	1.2	12	4.5	3.5	22	Kepler, similar to 730M with half of the cores disabled
GeForce GT 730M	January 2013	GK208	28	PCIe 3.0 x8	719		2	384:32:8 (2 SMX)	2	16.0	DDR3	128	5.8	23.0	552.2	1.2	12	4.5	3.5	33	Kepler, similar to Desktop GT640
GeForce GT 735M	April 1, 2013	GK208	28	PCIe 3.0 x8	889		2	384:32:8 (2 SMX)	2	16.0	DDR3	64	7.11	28.4	682.8	1.2	12	4.5	3.5	?	Kepler, similar to Desktop GT640
GeForce GT 740M	April 1, 2013	GK208	28	PCIe 3.0 x8	980		1.8	384:32:8 (2 SMX)	2	14.4	DDR3	64	7.84	31.4	752.6	1.2	12	4.5	3.5	?	Kepler, similar to Desktop GT640.
GeForce GT 740M	April 1, 2013	GK107	28	PCIe 3.0 x16	810		1.8; 5	384:32:16 (2 SMX)	2	28.8; 80	DDR3; GDDR5	128	12.96	25.92	622.1	1.2	12	4.5	3.0	45	about 76% of Desktop GTX650
GeForce GT 745M	April 1, 2013	GK107	28	PCIe 3.0 x16	837		2; 5	384:32:16 (2 SMX)	2	32; 80	DDR3; GDDR5	128	13.4	26.8	642.8	1.2	12	4.5	3.0	45	about 79% of Desktop GTX650
GeForce GT 750M	April 1, 2013	GK107	28	PCIe 3.0 x16	967		2; 5	384:32:16 (2 SMX)	2	32; 80	DDR3; GDDR5	128	15.5	30.9	742.7	1.2	12	4.5	3.0	50	about 91% of Desktop GTX650
GeForce GT 755M	?	GK107	28	PCIe 3.0 x16	1020		5.4	384:32:16 (2 SMX)	2	86.4	GDDR5	128	15.7	31.4	783	1.2	12	4.5	3.0	50	about 93% of Desktop GTX650
GeForce GTX 760M	May 2013	GK106	28	PCIe 3.0 x16	719		4	768:64:16 (4 SMX)	2	64	GDDR5	128	10.5	42.1	1104	1.2	12	4.5	3.0	55	about 71% of Desktop GTX 650Ti
GeForce GTX 765M	May 2013	GK106	28	PCIe 3.0 x16	863		4	768:64:16 (4 SMX)	2	64	GDDR5	128	13.6	54.4	1326	1.2	12	4.5	3.0	65	about 92% of Desktop GTX 650Ti
GeForce GTX 770M	May 2013	GK106	28	PCIe 3.0 x16	797		4	960:80:24 (5 SMX)	3	96	GDDR5	192	19.5	64.9	1530	1.2	12	4.5	3.0	75	about 83% of Desktop GTX660
GeForce GTX 780M	May 2013	GK104	28	PCIe 3.0 x16	797		5	1536:128:32 (8 SMX)	4	160	GDDR5	256	26.3	105.3	2448	1.2	12	4.5	3.0	122	about 78% of Desktop GTX770
Model	Launch	Code name	Fab (nm)	Bus interface	Clock speed			Core config^{1}	Memory				Fillrate		Processing power (GFLOPS)^{2}	Supported API version				TDP (Watts)	Notes
Model	Launch	Code name	Fab (nm)	Bus interface	Core (MHz)	Shader (MHz)	Memory (GT/s)	Core config^{1}	Size (GiB)	Bandwidth (GB/s)	Bus type	Bus width (bit)	Pixel (GP/s)	Texture (GT/s)	Processing power (GFLOPS)^{2}	Vulkan	Direct3D	OpenGL	CUDA	TDP (Watts)	Notes

=== GeForce 800M (8xxM) series ===
The GeForce 800M series for notebooks architecture. The processing power is obtained by multiplying shader clock speed, the number of cores, and how many instructions the cores can perform per cycle.

- ^{1} Unified shaders: texture mapping units: render output units
- 810M to 845M lack NVENC support

Model	Launch	Code name	Fab (nm)	Bus interface	Clock speed			Core config^{1}	Memory				Fillrate		Processing power (GFLOPS)^{2}	Supported API version				TDP (Watts)	Notes (original research)
Model	Launch	Code name	Fab (nm)	Bus interface	Core (MHz)	Shader (MHz)	Memory (GT/s)	Core config^{1}	Size (GiB)	Bandwidth (GB/s)	Bus type	Bus width (bit)	Pixel (GP/s)	Texture (GT/s)	Processing power (GFLOPS)^{2}	Vulkan	Direct3D	OpenGL	CUDA Compute Capability	TDP (Watts)	Notes (original research)
GeForce 810M	February 2014	GF117	28	PCIe 2.0 x16	738–888	1476–1776	1.8	48:8:4	1	14.4	DDR3	64	2.95–3.55	5.9–7.1	141.7–170.5	n/a	12	4.5	2.1	15	
GeForce 820M	February 2014	GF117	28	PCIe 2.0 x16	719–954	1438–1908	2	96:16:4	2	16	DDR3	64	2.9–3.8	11.5–15.3	276.1–366.3	n/a	12	4.5	2.1	15	115% of 620 (Fermi)
GeForce 825M	January 27, 2014	GK208	28	PCIe 3.0 x8	850		1.8	384:16:8 (2 SMX)	2	14.4	DDR3	64	6.8	13.6	652.8	1.2	12	4.5	3.5	33	94% of 630 (Kepler)
GeForce 830M	March 12, 2014	GM108	28	PCIe 3.0 x16	1029		1.8	256:16:8 (2 SMM)	2	14.4	DDR3	64	8.2	16.5	526.8	1.3	12	4.5	5.0	~25	50% of 750 (Maxwell)
GeForce 840M	March 12, 2014	GM108	28	PCIe 3.0 x16	1029		2	384:24:8 (3 SMM)	2–4	16	DDR3	64	8.2	24.7	790.3	1.3	12	4.5	5.0	30	50–80% of 745 (Maxwell)
GeForce 845M	February 7, 2015	GM108	28	PCIe 3.0 x16	1071–1150		5	384:32:16 (3 SMM)	2	40	GDDR5	64	18.8	37.6	903.2	1.3	12	4.5	5.0	33	
GeForce 845M	August 16, 2015	GM107	28	PCIe 3.0 x16	863		2	512:32:16 (4 SMM)	2	16	DDR3	64	13.8	27.6	883.7	1.3	12	4.5	5.0	45	
GeForce GTX 850M	March 12, 2014	GM107	28	PCIe 3.0 x16	876+Boost		5	640:40:16 (5 SMM)	2–4	80.2	GDDR5	128	14.0	35.0	1121.3	1.3	12	4.5	5.0	40	80% of 750Ti
GeForce GTX 850M	March 12, 2014	GM107	28	PCIe 3.0 x16	936+Boost		2	640:40:16 (5 SMM)	2–4	32	DDR3	128	15.0	37.4	1198.1	1.3	12	4.5	5.0	40	85% of 750Ti
GeForce GTX 860M	March 12, 2014	GM107	28	PCIe 3.0 x16	1029–1085		5	640:40:16 (5 SMM)	2	80	GDDR5	128	16.5	41.2	1389	1.3	12	4.5	5.0	40–45	equal to 750Ti
GeForce GTX 860M	March 12, 2014	GK104	28	PCIe 3.0 x16	797–915		5	1152:96:16 (6 SMX)	4	80	GDDR5	128	12.8	76.5	2108	1.2	12	4.5	3.0	75	similar to 660 OEM.
GeForce GTX 870M	March 12, 2014	GK104	28	PCIe 3.0 x16	941–967		5	1344:112:24 (7 SMX)	3, 6	120	GDDR5	192	22.6	105.4	2599	1.2	12	4.5	3.0	110	105% of 660Ti
GeForce GTX 880M	March 12, 2014	GK104	28	PCIe 3.0 x16	954–993		5	1536:128:32 (8 SMX)	4, 8	160	GDDR5	256	30.5	122.1	3104	1.2	12	4.5	3.0	130	90% of 770
Model	Launch	Code name	Fab (nm)	Bus interface	Clock speed			Core config^{1}	Memory				Fillrate		Processing power (GFLOPS)^{2}	Supported API version				TDP (Watts)	Notes (original research)
Model	Launch	Code name	Fab (nm)	Bus interface	Core (MHz)	Shader (MHz)	Memory (GT/s)	Core config^{1}	Size (GiB)	Bandwidth (GB/s)	Bus type	Bus width (bit)	Pixel (GP/s)	Texture (GT/s)	Processing power (GFLOPS)^{2}	Vulkan	Direct3D	OpenGL	CUDA Compute Capability	TDP (Watts)	Notes (original research)

=== GeForce 900M (9xxM) series ===
The GeForce 900M series for notebooks architecture. The processing power is obtained by multiplying shader clock speed, the number of cores, and how many instructions the cores can perform per cycle.

- ^{1} Unified shaders: texture mapping units: render output units
- 920M to 940M lack NVENC support

Model	Launch	Code name	Fab (nm)	Bus interface	Clock speed			Core config^{1}	Memory				Fillrate		Processing power (GFLOPS)^{2}	Supported API version				TDP (Watts)	Notes
Model	Launch	Code name	Fab (nm)	Bus interface	Min (MHz)	Average (MHz)	Memory (GT/s)	Core config^{1}	Size (GiB)	Bandwidth (GB/s)	Bus type	Bus width (bit)	Pixel (GP/s)	Texture (GT/s)	Processing power (GFLOPS)^{2}	Vulkan	Direct3D	OpenGL	OpenCL	TDP (Watts)	Notes
GeForce 910M	March 13, 2015	GK208B	28	PCIe 3.0 x8	641			384:32:8 (2 SMX)	2	16.02	DDR3	64	5.128	20.51	492.3	1.2	12 (11_0)	4.6	1.2	33	
GeForce 920M	March 12, 2015	GK208	28	PCIe 3.0 x16	954	Unknown	1.8	384:32:8 (2 SMX)	2	14.4	DDR3	64	7.6	30.5	733	1.2	12 (11_0)	4.6	1.2	33	
GeForce 930M	March 12, 2015	GM108	28	PCIe 3.0 x16	928	941	1.8	384:24:8 (3 SMM)	2	14.4	DDR3	64	7.4	22.3	713	1.3	12 (11_0)	4.6	1.2	29	
GeForce 940M	March 12, 2015	GM108	28	PCIe 3.0 x16	1072	1176	2	384:24:8 (3 SMM)	2	16	DDR3	64	8.6	25.7	823	1.3	12 (11_0)	4.6	1.2	36	
GeForce 940MX	January, 2016	GM108	28	PCIe 3.0 x16	1004	1242	2	384:24:8 (3 SMM)	2	16	DDR3	64	9.9	29.8	954	1.3	12 (11_0)	4.6	1.2	23	
GeForce 940MX	June 28, 2016	GM107	28	PCIe 3.0 x16	795	861	5	512:32:8 (4 SMM)	2	40	GDDR5	64	6.9	27.6	882	1.3	12 (11_0)	4.6	1.2	23	
GeForce GTX 950M	March 12, 2015	GM107	28	PCIe 3.0 x16	914	Unknown	5	640:40:16 (5 SMM)	2, 4	80	GDDR5	128	14.6	36.6	1170	1.3	12 (11_0)	4.6	1.2	Unknown	Similar core config to GTX 750 Ti (GM107-400-A2)
GeForce GTX 950M	March 12, 2015	GM107	28	PCIe 3.0 x16	914	Unknown	2	640:40:16 (5 SMM)	2, 4	32	DDR3	128	14.6	36.6		1.3	12 (11_0)	4.6	1.2	55	Similar core config to GTX 750 Ti (GM107-400-A2)
GeForce GTX 960M	March 12, 2015	GM107	28	PCIe 3.0 x16	1097	1176	5	640:40:16 (5 SMM)	2, 4	80	GDDR5	128	17.5	43.8	1403	1.3	12 (11_0)	4.6	1.2	65	Similar core config to GTX 750 Ti (GM107-400-A2)
GeForce GTX 965M	January 5, 2015	GM204	28	PCIe 3.0 x16	944	Unknown	5	1024:64:32 (8 SMM)	2, 4	80	GDDR5	128	30.2	60.4	1933	1.3	12 (12_1)	4.6	1.2	60	Similar core config to GTX 960 (GM206-300)
GeForce GTX 970M	October 7, 2014	GM204	28	PCIe 3.0 x16	944	993	5	1280:80:48 (10 SMM)	3, 6	120	GDDR5	192	44.4	73.9	2365	1.3	12 (12_1)	4.6	1.2	75	Similar core config to GTX 960 OEM (GM204)
GeForce GTX 980M	October 7, 2014	GM204	28	PCIe 3.0 x16	1038	1127	5	1536:96:64 (12 SMM)	4, 8	160	GDDR5	256	66.4	99.6	3189	1.3	12 (12_1)	4.6	1.2	100	Similar core config to GTX 970 (GM204-200) with one SMM disabled
GeForce GTX 980	September 22, 2015	GM204	28	PCIe 3.0 x16	1064	Unknown	7.01	2048:128:64 (16 SMM)	8	224	GDDR5	256	68.1	136.2	4358	1.3	12 (12_1)	4.6	1.2	165, oc to 200	Similar to Desktop GTX 980
Model	Launch	Code name	Fab (nm)	Bus interface	Clock speed			Core config^{1}	Memory				Fillrate		Processing power (GFLOPS)^{2}	Supported API version				TDP (Watts)	Notes
Model	Launch	Code name	Fab (nm)	Bus interface	Min (MHz)	Average (MHz)	Memory (GT/s)	Core config^{1}	Size (GiB)	Bandwidth (GB/s)	Bus type	Bus width (bit)	Pixel (GP/s)	Texture (GT/s)	Processing power (GFLOPS)^{2}	Vulkan	Direct3D	OpenGL	OpenCL	TDP (Watts)	Notes

=== GeForce 10 series ===
- Unified shaders: texture mapping units: render output units
- Improved NVENC (Better support for H265, VP9,...)
- Supported APIs: Direct3D 12 (12_1), OpenGL 4.6, OpenCL 3.0, Vulkan 1.3 and CUDA 6.1

Model name	Launch	Code name	Fab (nm)	Transistors (billion)	Die size (mm^{2})	Bus interface	Clock speeds			Core config	Memory				Fillrate		Processing power (GFLOPS)			Supported API version				TDP (Watts)	SLI support
Model name	Launch	Code name	Fab (nm)	Transistors (billion)	Die size (mm^{2})	Bus interface	Base core clock (MHz)	Boost core clock (MHz)	Memory (GT/s)	Core config	Size (GiB)	Bandwidth (GB/s)	Bus type	Bus width (bit)	Pixel (GP/s)	Texture (GT/s)	Half precision	Single precision (Boost)	Double precision	Direct3D	OpenGL	Vulkan	OpenCL	TDP (Watts)	SLI support
GeForce GTX 1050 (Notebook)	January 3, 2017	GP107 (N17P-G0-A1)	14 nm	3.3	135	PCIe 3.0 x16	1354	1493	7	640:40:16	4	112	GDDR5	128	21.7	54.2	14	1733 (1911)	27	12 (12_1)	4.5	1.3	1.2	53	No
GeForce GTX 1050 Ti (Notebook)	January 3, 2017	GP107 (N17P-G1-A1)	14 nm	3.3	135	PCIe 3.0 x16	1493	1620	7	768:48:32	4	112	GDDR5	128	47.8	71.7	18	2293 (2488)	36		4.5	1.3	1.2	64	No
GeForce GTX 1060 (Notebook)	August 16, 2016	GP106	16 nm	4.4	200	PCIe 3.0 x16	1404	1670	8	1280:80:48	6	192	GDDR5	192	67.4	112	56	3594 (4275)	112		4.5	1.3	1.2	80	No
GeForce GTX 1060 Max-Q	May 2017	GP106	16 nm	4.4	200	PCIe 3.0 x16	1063	1480	8	1280:80:48	6	192	GDDR5	192	71.04	118.4	59.20	3789	118.4		4.5	1.3	1.2	80	No
GeForce GTX 1060 Max-Q	May 2017	GP106B	16 nm	4.4	200	PCIe 3.0 x16	1265	1480	8	1280:80:48	6	192	GDDR5	192	71.04	118.4		3789	118.4		4.5	1.3	1.2	80	No
GeForce GTX 1070 (Notebook)	August 16, 2016	GP104/ GP104B	16 nm	7.2	314	PCIe 3.0 x16	1442	1645	8	2048:128:64	8	256	GDDR5	256	92.3	185	92	5906 (6738)	185		4.5	1.3	1.2	115	Yes
GeForce GTX 1070 Max-Q	May 2017	GP104/ GP104B	16 nm	7.2	314	PCIe 3.0 x16	1101	1379	8	2048:128:64	8	256	GDDR5	256	88.26	176.5	88.26	5648	176.5		4.5	1.3	1.2	?	No
GeForce GTX 1080 (Notebook)	August 16, 2016	GP104/ GP104B	16 nm	7.2	314	PCIe 3.0 x16	1556	1733	10	2560:160:64	8	320	GDDR5X	256	99.6	249	124	7967 (8873)	249		4.5	1.3	1.2	150	Yes
GeForce GTX 1080 Max-Q	May 2017	GP104/ GP104B	16 nm	7.2	314	PCIe 3.0 x16	1101	1468	10	2560:160:64	8	320	GDDR5X	256	93.95	234.9	117.4	7516	234.9		4.5	1.3	1.2	?	No

=== GeForce 16 series ===
- Supported APIs: Direct3D 12 (12_1), OpenGL 4.6, OpenCL 3.0, Vulkan 1.3 and CUDA 7.5, improve NVENC
- No SLI, no TensorCore, and no Raytracing hardware acceleration.

Model	Launch	Code name	Process	Transistors (billion)	Die size (mm^{2})	Bus interface	Clock speeds		Core config	L2 Cache (MiB)	Memory (GT/s)	Memory				Fillrate		Processing power (GFLOPS)			TDP (Watts)
Model	Launch	Code name	Process	Transistors (billion)	Die size (mm^{2})	Bus interface	Base core clock (MHz)	Boost core clock (MHz)	Core config	L2 Cache (MiB)		Size (GiB)	Bandwidth (GB/s)	Bus type	Bus width (bit)	Pixel (GP/s)	Texture (GT/s)	Half precision	Single precision	Double precision	TDP (Watts)
Geforce GTX 1630	Jun 28, 2022	TU117	TSMC 12FFN	4.7	200	PCIe 3.0 x16	1740	1785	512:32:16	1.0	12	4	96	GDDR6	64	28.56	57.12	3656	1828	57.12	75
GeForce GTX 1650 (Laptop)	April 23, 2019	TU117	TSMC 12FFN	4.7	200	PCIe 3.0 x16	1395	1560	1024:64:32	1.0	8	4	128	GDDR5	128	49.92	99.84	6390	3195	99.84	50
GeForce GTX 1650 Max-Q	April 23, 2019	TU117(N18P-G0-MP-A1)	TSMC 12FFN	4.7	200	PCIe 3.0 x16	1020	1245	1024:64:32	1.0	8	4	112	GDDR5	128	39.84	79.68	5100	2550	79.68	30
GeForce GTX 1650 Ti Max-Q	April 2, 2020	TU117	TSMC 12FFN	4.7	200	PCIe 3.0 x16	1035	1200	1024:64:32	1.0	12	4	192	GDDR6	128	38.4	76.8	4915	2458	76.8	35
GeForce GTX 1650 Ti	April 2, 2020	TU117(N18P-G62-A1)	TSMC 12FFN	4.7	200	PCIe 3.0 x16	1350	1485	1024:64:32	1.0	12	4	192	GDDR6	128	47.52	95.04	6083	3041	95.04	55
GeForce GTX 1660 (Laptop)	?	TU116	TSMC 12FFN	6.6	284	PCIe 3.0 x16	1455	1599	1408:88:48	1.5	16	6	384	GDDR6	192	76.32	127.2	8141	4070	127.2	?
GeForce GTX 1660 Ti Max-Q	April 23, 2019	TU116	TSMC 12FFN	6.6	284	PCIe 3.0 x16	1140	1335	1536:96:46	1.5	12	6	288	GDDR6	192	64.08	128.2	8202	4101	128.2	60
GeForce GTX 1660 Ti (Laptop)	April 23, 2019	TU116	TSMC 12FFN	6.6	284	PCIe 3.0 x16	1455	1590	1536:96:46	1.5	12	6	288	GDDR6	192	76.32	152.6	9769	4884	152.6	80

=== GeForce RTX 20 series ===
- Supported APIs: Direct3D 12 (12_2), OpenGL 4.6, OpenCL 3.0, Vulkan 1.3 and CUDA 7.5, improve NVENC (Support B-Frame on H265...)
- MX Graphics lack NVENC and they are based on Pascal architecture.
- Add TensorCore and Ray tracing hardware acceleration, RTX IO (Only on RTX cards)
- Nvidia DLSS

Model name	Launch	Code name	Process	Transistors (billion)	Die size (mm^{2})	Bus interface	Clock speeds			Core config (Note: Main Shader Processors : Texture Mapping Units : Render Output Units : Tensor Cores (or FP16 Cores in GeForce 16 series) : Ray-tracing Cores (Streaming Multiprocessors) (Graphics Processing Clusters))	L2 Cache (MiB)	Memory				Fillrate (Note: Base clock, Boost clock)		Processing power (GFLOPS)				Ray tracing Performance		TDP (Watts)
Model name	Launch	Code name	Process	Transistors (billion)	Die size (mm^{2})	Bus interface	Base core clock (MHz)	Boost core clock (MHz)	Memory (GT/s)	Core config	L2 Cache (MiB)	Size (GiB)	Bandwidth (GB/s)	Bus type	Bus width (bit)	Pixel (GP/s) (Note: Pixel fillrate is calculated as the lowest of three numbers: number of ROPs multiplied by the base core clock speed, number of rasterizers multiplied by the number of fragments they can generate per rasterizer multiplied by the base core clock speed, and the number of streaming multiprocessors multiplied by the number of fragments per clock that they can output multiplied by the base clock rate.)	Texture (GT/s) (Note: Texture fillrate is calculated as the number of TMUs multiplied by the base core clock speed.)	Half precision	Single precision	Double precision	Tensor compute (FP16)	Rays/s (Billions)	RTX OPS/s (Trillions)	TDP (Watts)
GeForce RTX 2050	January 3, 2022	GA107 (Ampere)	Samsung 8N	8.7	200	PCIe 3.0 x8	1155	1477	14	2048:64: 32:64:32 (16) (3)	2	4	112.0	GDDR6	64									30-45
GeForce RTX 2060	January 29, 2019	TU106	TSMC; 12FFN	10.8	445	PCIe 3.0 x16	960	1200	14	1920:120: 48:240:30 (30) (3)	3	6	336.0	GDDR6	192	57.6	144	9216	4608	144.0				80
GeForce RTX 2060 Max-Q	January 29, 2019	TU106	TSMC; 12FFN	10.8	445	PCIe 3.0 x16	975	1175	11	1920:120: 48:240:30 (30) (3)	3	6	264.0	GDDR6	192	56.88	142.2	9101	4550	142.2				65
GeForce RTX 2070	January 29, 2019	TU106	TSMC; 12FFN	10.8	445	PCIe 3.0 x16	1215	1440	14	2304:144: 64:288:36 (36) (3)	4	8	448.0	GDDR6	256	92.16	207.4	13270	6636	207.4				115
GeForce RTX 2070 Max-Q	January 29, 2019	TU106	TSMC; 12FFN	10.8	445	PCIe 3.0 x16	885	1185	12	2304:144: 64:288:36 (36) (3)	4	8	448.0	GDDR6	256	75.84	170.6	10920	5460	170.6				80
GeForce RTX 2070 Super	April 2, 2020	TU104	TSMC; 12FFN	13.6	545	PCIe 3.0 x16	1140	1380	14	2560:160: 64:320:40 (40) (5)	4	8	448.0	GDDR6	256	88.3	220.8	14130	7066	220.8				115
GeForce RTX 2070 Super Max-Q	April 2, 2020	TU104	TSMC; 12FFN	13.6	545	PCIe 3.0 x16	930	1155	12	2560:160: 64:320:40 (40) (5)	4	8	448.0	GDDR6	256	69.1	172.8	11060	5530	172.8				80
GeForce RTX 2080	January 29, 2019	TU104	TSMC; 12FFN	13.6	545	PCIe 3.0 x16	1380	1590	14	2944:184: 64:368:46 (46) (6)	4	8	384.0	GDDR6	256	101.8	292.6	18720	9362	292.6				150
GeForce RTX 2080 Max-Q	January 29, 2019	TU104	TSMC; 12FFN	13.6	545	PCIe 3.0 x16	735	1095	12	2944:184: 64:368:46 (46) (6)	4	8	384.0	GDDR6	256	70.08	201.5	12890	6447	201.5				80
GeForce RTX 2080 Super	April 2, 2020	TU104	TSMC; 12FFN	13.6	545	PCIe 3.0 x16	1365	1560	14	3072:192: 64:384:48 (48) (6)	4	8	448.0	GDDR6	256	99.8	299.5	19170	9585	299.5				150
GeForce RTX 2080 Super Max-Q	April 2, 2020	TU104	TSMC; 12FFN	13.6	545	PCIe 3.0 x16	735	1080	11	3072:192: 64:384:48 (48) (6)	4	8	352.0	GDDR6	256	69.1	207.4	13270	6636	207.4				80

=== GeForce RTX 30 series ===
- Supported APIs: Direct3D 12 Ultimate (12_2), OpenGL 4.6, OpenCL 3.0, Vulkan 1.3 and CUDA 8.6
- Tensor core 3rd gen
- RT core 2nd gen
- RTX IO
- Improve NVDEC (Add AV1)

Model name	Launch	Code name	Process	Transistors (billion)	Die size (mm^{2})	Bus interface	Clock speeds (Note: Which base and boost core clockspeeds the GPU has depends on the TDP configuration set by the system builder)			Core config (Note: Main Shader Processors : Texture Mapping Units : Render Output Units : Tensor Cores (or FP16 Cores in GeForce 16 series) : Ray-tracing Cores (Streaming Multiprocessors) (Graphics Processing Clusters))	L2 Cache (MiB)	Memory				Fillrate (Note: Base clock, Boost clock.)		Processing power (TFLOPS)					Ray tracing Performance		TDP (Watts)
Model name	Launch	Code name	Process	Transistors (billion)	Die size (mm^{2})	Bus interface	Base core (MHz)	Boost core (MHz)	Memory (MHz) (Gb/s) (GT/s)	Core config	L2 Cache (MiB)	Size (GiB)	Bandwidth (GB/s)	Bus type	Bus width (bit)	Pixel (GP/s) (Note: Pixel fillrate is calculated as the lowest of three numbers: number of ROPs multiplied by the base core clock speed, number of rasterizers multiplied by the number of fragments they can generate per rasterizer multiplied by the base core clock speed, and the number of streaming multiprocessors multiplied by the number of fragments per clock that they can output multiplied by the base clock rate.)	Texture (GT/s) (Note: Texture fillrate is calculated as the number of TMUs multiplied by the base core clock speed.)	Half precision	Single precision	Double precision	Tensor compute (FP16)	Tensor TOPS (INT8)	Rays/s (Billions)	RTX OPS/s (Trillions)	TDP (Watts)
GeForce RTX 3050 Mobile/ Laptop	May 11, 2021	GA107	Samsung 8N	8.7	200	PCIe 4.0 x8	712–1530; 622-1237	1057–1740; 990-1492	1375–1500; 11–12; 11–12; 1375–1750; 11–14; 11–14	2048:64: 32:64:16 (16) (3); 2560:80: 32:80:20 (20) (?)	2	4; 6	176.0-192.0; 132.0-224.0	GDDR6	128; 96	22.7-48.9; 33.8-55.6	45.6-97.9; 67.7-111.4	2.92-6.27; 4.33-7.13	2.92-6.27; 4.33-7.13	0.046-0.098; 0.068-0.111					35–80
GeForce RTX 3050 Ti Mobile/ Laptop	May 11, 2021	GA107	Samsung 8N	8.7	200	PCIe 4.0 x8	735–1462	1035–1695	12	2560:80: 48:80:20 (20) (3)	2	4	192	GDDR6	128	35.3-70.2; 49.7-81.4	58.8-117.0; 82.8-135.6	3.76-7.49; 5.30-8.68	3.76-7.49; 5.30-8.68	0.059-0.117; 0.083-0.136					35–80
GeForce RTX 3060 Mobile/ Laptop	January 12, 2021	GA106	Samsung 8N	12.0	276	PCIe 4.0 x16	817–1387	1282–1702	12; 14	3840:120: 48:120:30 (30) (3)	3	6	288; 336	GDDR6	192	39.2-66.6; 61.54-81.7	98.0-166.4; 153.8-204.2	6.27-10.65; 9.85-13.07	6.27-10.65; 9.85-13.07	0.108-0.166; 0.154-0.204					60-115
GeForce RTX 3070 Mobile/ Laptop	January 12, 2021	GA104-770-A1	Samsung 8N	17.4	392	PCIe 4.0 x16	780–1215	1290–1720	12; 14	5120:160: 80:160:40 (40) (6)	4	8	384; 448	GDDR6	256	62.4-97.2; 103.2-129.6	124.8-194.4; 206.4-259.2	7.99-12.44; 13.21-16.59	7.99-12.44; 13.21-16.59	0.125-0.194; 0.206-0.259					80–125
GeForce RTX 3070 Ti Mobile/ Laptop	January 4, 2022	GA104	Samsung 8N	17.4	392	PCIe 4.0 x16	510-1035	1035-1485	12; 14	5888:184: 96:184:46 (46) (6)	4	8	384; 448	GDDR6	256	46.9-95.2; 95.2-136.6	93.8-190.4; 190.4-273.2	6.01-12.19; 12.19-17.49	6.01-12.19; 12.19-17.49	0.094-0.190; 0.190-0.273	16.6				80–125
GeForce RTX 3080 Mobile/ Laptop	January 12, 2021	GA104-775-A1	Samsung 8N	17.4	392	PCIe 4.0 x16	780-1350	1245-1810	12; 14	6144:192: 96:192:48 (48) (6)	4	8-16	384; 448	GDDR6	256	74.9-129.6; 119.5-164.2	149.8-259.2; 239.0-328.3	9.59-16.59; 15.30-22.2	9.59-16.59; 15.30-22.2	0.150-0.259; 0.239-0.328					80–150
GeForce RTX 3080 Ti Mobile/ Laptop	January 25, 2022	GA103	Samsung 8N	22	496	PCIe 4.0 x16	585-1230	1125-1590	12; 16	7424:232: 116:232:58 (58) (6)	4	16	384; 512	GDDR6	256	67.9-142.7; 130.5-184.4	135.7-285.4; 261.0-368.9	8.68-18.26; 16.7-23.60	8.68-18.26; 16.7-23.60	0.136-0.285; 0.261-0.369	18.71				80–150

=== GeForce RTX 40 series ===
- Supported APIs: Direct3D 12 Ultimate (12_2), OpenGL 4.6, OpenCL 3.0, Vulkan 1.3 and CUDA 8.9
- Tensor core 4th gen
- RT core 3rd gen
- DLSS 3 (Super Resolution + Frame Generation)
- SER

Model name	Launch	Code name	Process	Transistors (billion)	Die size (mm^{2})	Bus interface	Clock speeds (Note: Which base and boost core clockspeeds the GPU has depends on the TDP configuration set by the system builder)			Core config (Note: Main Shader Processors : Texture Mapping Units : Render Output Units : Tensor Cores : Ray-tracing Cores (Streaming Multiprocessors) (Graphics Processing Clusters))	L2 Cache (MiB)	Memory				Fillrate (Note: Base clock, Boost clock.)		Processing power (TFLOPS)					Ray tracing Performance		TDP (Watts)
Model name	Launch	Code name	Process	Transistors (billion)	Die size (mm^{2})	Bus interface	Base core (MHz)	Boost core (MHz)	Memory (MHz) (Gb/s) (GT/s)	Core config	L2 Cache (MiB)	Size (GiB)	Bandwidth (GB/s)	Bus type	Bus width (bit)	Pixel (GP/s) (Note: Pixel fillrate is calculated as the lowest of three numbers: number of ROPs multiplied by the base core clock speed, number of rasterizers multiplied by the number of fragments they can generate per rasterizer multiplied by the base core clock speed, and the number of streaming multiprocessors multiplied by the number of fragments per clock that they can output multiplied by the clock rate.)	Texture (GT/s) (Note: Texture fillrate is calculated as the number of TMUs multiplied by the core clock speed.)	Half precision	Single precision	Double precision	Tensor compute (FP16)	Tensor TOPS (INT8)	Rays/s (Billions)	RTX OPS/s (Trillions)	TDP (Watts)
GeForce RTX 4050 Mobile/ Laptop	February 22, 2023	AD107; GN21-X2	TSMC 4N	18.9	146	PCIe 4.0 x8	1140-2370	1605-2370	2000; 16; 14000 (Max-Q); 16	2560:80: 32:80:20 (20) (2)	12	6	168.0; 192.0	GDDR6	96	36.4-75.8; 51.3-75.8	91.2-189.6; 128.4-189.6	5.83-12.1; 8.21-12.1	5.83-12.1; 8.21-12.1	0.09-0.18; 0.12-0.18	46.6-97.0; 65.7-97.0	93.3-194.1; 131.5-194.1			35–115
GeForce RTX 4060 Mobile/ Laptop	February 22, 2023	AD107; GN21-X4	TSMC 4N	18.9	146	PCIe 4.0 x8	1140-2295	1470-2370	2000; 16; 14000 (Max-Q); 16	3072:96: 32:96:24 (24) (2)	32	8	224.0; 256.0	GDDR6	128	36.4-73.4; 47.0-75.8	109.4-220.3; 141.1-227.5	7.00-14.1; 9.03-14.5	7.00-14.1; 9.03-14.5	0.10-0.22; 0.14-0.23	56.0-112.8; 72.2-116.4	112.0-225.6; 144.5-232.9			35–115
GeForce RTX 4070 Mobile/ Laptop	February 22, 2023	AD106; GN21-X6	TSMC 4N	22.9	190	PCIe 4.0 x8	735-2070	1230-2175	2000; 16; 14000 (Max-Q); 16	4608:144: 48:144:36 (36) (3)	32	8	224.0; 256.0	GDDR6	128	35.2-99.3; 59.0-104.4	105.8-298.0; 177.1-313.2	6.77-19.0; 11.3-20.0	6.77-19.0; 11.3-20.0	0.10-0.29; 0.17-0.31	54.1-152.6; 90.6-160.3	108.3-305.2; 181.3-320.7			35–115
GeForce RTX 4080 Mobile/ Laptop	February 8, 2023	AD104; GN21-X9	TSMC 4N	35.8	295	PCIe 4.0 x16	795-1860	1350-2280	2250; 18; 14000 (Max-Q); 18	7424:232: 80:232:58 (58) (5)	48	12	336.0; 432.0	GDDR6	192	63.6-148.8 108.0-182.4	184.4-431.5 313.2-528.9	11.8-27.6 20.0-33.8	11.8-27.6 20.0-33.8	0.18-0.43 0.31-0.52	94.4-220.9; 160.3-270.8	188.8-441.8; 320.7-541.6			60-150
GeForce RTX 4090 Mobile/ Laptop	February 8, 2023	AD103; GN21-X11	TSMC 4N	45.9	379	PCIe 4.0 x16	930-1620	1455-2580	2250; 18; 14000 (Max-Q); 18	9728:304: 112:304:76 (76) (7)	64	16	448.0; 576.0	GDDR6	256	104.1-181.4; 162.9-288.9	282.7-492.4; 442.3-784.3	18.0-31.5; 28.3-50.1	18.0-31.5; 28.3-50.1	0.28-0.49; 0.44-0.78	144.8-252.1; 226.4-401.5	289.5-504.2; 452.9-803.1			80-150

=== GeForce RTX 50 series ===
Laptops featuring GeForce RTX 50 series laptop GPUs were shown at CES 2025. Laptops with RTX 50 series GPUs were paired with Intel's Arrow Lake-HX and AMD's Strix Point and Fire Range CPUs. Nvidia claims that Blackwell architecture's new Max-Q features can increase battery life by up to 40% over GeForce 40 series laptops. For example, Advanced Power Gating saves power by turning off areas of the GPU that are unused and the paired GDDR7 memory can run in an "ultra" low-voltage state. Initial RTX 50 series laptops will become available in March 2025.

GeForce RTX		5050 Laptop	5060 Laptop	5070 Laptop	5070 Ti Laptop	5080 Laptop	5090 Laptop
Release date		Jun 2025	May 2025	Apr 2025	Mar 2025		
GPU die		GB207	GB206	GB206-300	GB205-200	GB203-400	GB203-400
Transistors (billion)		16.9	21.9		31.1	45.6	
Die size		149 mm^{2}	181 mm^{2}		263 mm^{2}	378 mm^{2}	
Core	CUDA cores	2,560	3,328	4,608	5,888	7,680	10,496
Core	Texture mapping unit	80	104	144	184	240	328
Core	Render output unit	32	48	48	64	96	112
Core	Ray tracing cores	20	26	36	46	60	82
Core	Tensor cores	80	104	144	184	240	328
Core	Clock speed (GHz) Boost value (GHz)	1500; 2662	1455; 2497	1425; 2347	1447; 2220	1500; 2287	1597; 2160
Streaming multiprocessors		20	26	36	46	60	82
Cache	L1	2.5 MB	3.25 MB	4.5 MB	5.75 MB	7.5 MB	10.25 MB
Cache	L2	32 MB			48 MB	64 MB	
Memory	Type	GDDR7					
Memory	Size	8 GB			12 GB	16 GB	24 GB
Memory	Clock (Gb/s)	24			28		
Memory	Bandwidth (GB/s)	384			672	896	
Memory	Bus width	128-bit			192-bit	256-bit	
Fillrate	Pixel (Gpx/s) (Note: Pixel fillrate is calculated as the number of render output units (ROPs) multiplied by the base (or boost) core clock speed.)	85.2	119.9	112.7	142.1	219.6	241.9
Fillrate	Texture (Gtex/s) (Note: Texture fillrate is calculated as the number of texture mapping units (TMUs) multiplied by the base (or boost) core clock speed.)	213.0	259.7	338.0	408.5	548.9	708.5
Processing power (TFLOPS)	FP16/FP32	13.63	16.62	21.63	26.14	35.13	45.34
Processing power (TFLOPS)	FP64	0.213	0.260	0.338	0.408	0.549	0.708
Processing power (TFLOPS)	Tensor compute [sparse]						
Interface	Host	PCIe 5.0 x16					
TDP		50-100 W	45-100 W	50-100 W	60-115 W	80-150 W	95-150 W

=== GeForce MX series ===
Model (Architecture)	Launch	Code name(s)	Process	Transistors (billion)	Die size (mm^{2})	Bus interface	Clock speeds			L2 Cache (MiB)	Core config (Note: Shader Processors : Texture mapping units : Render output units : Streaming Multiprocessors : Ray tracing cores : Tensor Cores)	Memory				Fillrate (Note: Base clock, Boost clock)		Processing power (GFLOPS)				Ray tracing Performance		TDP (Watts)
Model (Architecture)	Launch	Code name(s)	Process	Transistors (billion)	Die size (mm^{2})	Bus interface	Base core clock (MHz)	Boost core clock (MHz)	Memory (GT/s)	L2 Cache (MiB)	Core config	Size (GiB)	Bandwidth (GB/s)	Type	Bus width (bit)	Pixel (GP/s) (Note: Pixel fillrate is calculated as the lowest of three numbers: number of ROPs multiplied by the base core clock speed, number of rasterizers multiplied by the number of fragments they can generate per rasterizer multiplied by the base core clock speed, and the number of streaming multiprocessors multiplied by the number of fragments per clock that they can output multiplied by the base clock rate.)	Texture (GT/s) (Note: Texture fillrate is calculated as the number of TMUs multiplied by the base core clock speed.)	Half precision	Single precision	Double precision	Tensor compute (FP16)	Rays/s (Billions)	RTX OPS (Trillions)	TDP (Watts)
GeForce MX110 (Maxwell)	Nov 17, 2017	GM108 (N16V-GMR1-A1)	TSMC; 28 nm	1.02	77	PCIe 3.0 ×4	965	993	1.8 (DDR3); 5 (GDDR5)	1	256:16 :8:3	2	14.4 (DDR3); 40.1 (GDDR5)	DDR3; GDDR5	64	(7.944)	(15.89)	—N/a	(508.4)	(15.89)	—N/a	—N/a	—N/a	30
GeForce MX130 (Maxwell)	Nov 17, 2017	GM108 (N16S-GTR-A1)	TSMC; 28 nm	1.02	77	PCIe 3.0 ×4	1122	1242	1.8 (DDR3); 5 (GDDR5)	1	384:24 :8:3	2	14.4 (DDR3); 40.1 (GDDR5)	DDR3; GDDR5	64	(9.936)	(29.81)	—N/a	861.7 (953.9)	26.93 (29.81)	—N/a	—N/a	—N/a	30
GeForce MX150 (Pascal)	May 17, 2017	GP108 (N17S-LG-A1)	Samsung; 14 nm	1.8	74	PCIe 3.0 ×4	937	1038	5	0.5	384:24 :16:3	2; 4	40	GDDR5	64	(14.99)	(22.49)	11.24 (12.45)	719.6 (797.2)	22.49 (24.91)	—N/a	—N/a	—N/a	10
GeForce MX150 (Pascal)	May 17, 2017	GP108-650-A1 (N17S-G1-A1)	Samsung; 14 nm	1.8	74	PCIe 3.0 ×4	1468	1532	6	0.5	384:24 :16:3	2; 4	48	GDDR5	64	(23.49)	(35.23)	17.62 (18.38)	1127 (1177)	35.23 (36.77)	—N/a	—N/a	—N/a	25
GeForce MX230 (Pascal)	Feb 20, 2019	GP108 (N17S-G0-A1)	Samsung; 14 nm	1.8	74	PCIe 3.0 ×4	1519	1531	7	0.5	256:16 :16:2	2; 4	56	GDDR5	64	(25.31)	(25.31)	(12.66)	(810.0)	(25.31)	—N/a	—N/a	—N/a	10
GeForce MX250 (Pascal)	Feb 20, 2019	GP108 (N17S-LG-A1)	Samsung; 14 nm	1.8	74	PCIe 3.0 ×4	937	1038	7	0.5	384:24 :16:3	2; 4	48	GDDR5	64	(16.61)	(24.91)	(12.46)	(797.2)	(24.91)	—N/a	—N/a	—N/a	10
GeForce MX250 (Pascal)	Feb 20, 2019	GP108 (N17S-G2-A1)	Samsung; 14 nm	1.8	74	PCIe 3.0 ×4	1518	1582	7	0.5	384:24 :16:3	2; 4	56	GDDR5	64	(24.3)	(36.4)	(18.98)	(1166)	(37.97)	—N/a	—N/a	—N/a	25
GeForce MX330 (Pascal)	Feb 12, 2020	GP108-655-A1 (N17S-LP-A1) (N17S-G3-A1)	Samsung; 14 nm	1.8	74	PCIe 3.0 ×4	746 (LP); 1531	936 (LP); 1594	7	0.5	384:24 :16:3	2; 4	56	GDDR5	64	(25.50)	(38.26)	(19.13)	(1224)	(38.26)	—N/a	—N/a	—N/a	10–30
GeForce MX350 (Pascal)	Feb 12, 2020	GP107-670-A1 (N17S-LP-A1) (N17S-G5-A1)	Samsung; 14 nm	3.3	132	PCIe 3.0 ×4	747 (LP); 1354	937 (LP); 1468	7	0.5	640:32 :16:5	2; 4	56	GDDR5	64	(23.49)	(46.98)	(29.36)	(1879)	(58.72)	—N/a	—N/a	—N/a	15–25
GeForce MX450 (Turing)	Aug 1, 2020	TU117 (N18S-LP-A1) (N18S-G5-A1)	TSMC; 12FFN	4.7	200	PCIe 4.0 ×4	720 (LP); 1395	930 (LP); 1575	7	1	896:56 :32:14	2	56	GDDR5	64	23.04 (50.40)	40.32 (88.20)	2581 (5645)	1290 (2822)	40.32 (88.20)	—N/a	—N/a	—N/a	10-30
GeForce MX450 (Turing)	Aug 1, 2020	TU117 (N18S-LP-A1) (N18S-G5-A1)	TSMC; 12FFN	4.7	200	PCIe 4.0 ×4	720 (LP); 1395	930 (LP); 1575	10	1	896:56 :32:14	2	80	GDDR6	64	23.04 (50.40)	40.32 (88.20)	2581 (5645)	1290 (2822)	40.32 (88.20)	—N/a	—N/a	—N/a	10-30
GeForce MX550 (Turing)	Mar 2022	TU117-670-A1 (GN18-S5-A1)	TSMC; 12FFN	4.7	200	PCIe 4.0 ×4	1065	1320	12	2	1024:32 :16:8	2; 4	96	GDDR6	64	(21.12)	(42.24)	(2703)	(2703)	(42.24)	—N/a	—N/a	—N/a	15–30
GeForce MX570 (Ampere)	Mar 2022	GA107 (GN20-S5-A1)	Samsung; 8N	8.7	200	PCIe 4.0 ×4	1087	1155	12	2	2048:64 :40:16 :16:64	2; 4	96	GDDR6	64	(46.20)	(73.92)	(4731)	(4731)	(73.92)				15–45

== Workstation / Mobile Workstation GPUs ==
=== Quadro NVS ===
- ^{1} Vertex shaders: pixel shaders: texture mapping units: render output units
- ^{2} Unified shaders: texture mapping units: render output units
- ^{*} NV31, NV34 and NV36 are 2x2 pipeline designs if running vertex shader, otherwise they are 4x1 pipeline designs.

Model	Launch	Code name	Fab (nm)	Bus interface	Core clock (MHz)	Shader clock (MHz)	Memory clock (MHz)	Core config^{12*}	Memory				Fillrate		Processing power (GFLOPS)	Supported API version			TDP (Watts)	Notes
Model	Launch	Code name	Fab (nm)	Bus interface	Core clock (MHz)	Shader clock (MHz)	Memory clock (MHz)	Core config^{12*}	Size (MiB)	Bandwidth (GB/s)	Bus type	Bus width (bit)	Pixel (GP/s)	Texture (GT/s)	Single precision	Direct3D	OpenGL	Vulkan	TDP (Watts)	Notes
NVS 50	May 31, 2005	NV18	150	AGP 4× / PCI	250	250	200	0:2:4:2	64	1.6	DDR	32	0.5	1.0		7	1.2	n/a		DVI-I, S-Video
NVS 100	Dec 22, 2003	NV17	150	AGP 4× / PCI	200		333	0:2:4:2	64	2.664	DDR	64				7	1.2	n/a		2× DVI-I, VGA, S-Video
NVS 200	Dec 22, 2003	NV17	150	AGP 4× / PCI	250	250	250	0:2:4:2	64	8.0	DDR	128	0.5	1.0		7	1.2	n/a		LFH-60
NVS 210S	Dec 22, 2003	MCP51	90	Integrated	425			1:2:2:1	Up to 256 from system memory		DDR	128	0.425	0.850		9.0c	1.2	n/a		DVI + VGA
NVS 280	Oct 28, 2003	NV34GL	150	PCIe x16/AGP 8× / PCI	275	275	250	0:2:4:2/ 1:2:2:2 *:4:4:4	64	8.0	DDR	128	0.55	1.1		9.0	1.5	n/a	13	DMS-59
NVS 285	Jun 6, 2006	NV44	110	PCIe x1/x16	275	275	275	3:4:4:2	128	8.8	DDR	128	0.55	1.1		9.0	2.1	n/a	18	DMS-59
NVS 290	Oct 4, 2007	G86-827-A2	80	PCIe x1/x16	460	920	800	16:8:4	256	6.4	DDR2	64	1.84	3.68	44.16	10	3.3	n/a	21	DMS-59
NVS 295	May 7, 2009	G98	65	PCIe x1/x16	550	1300	1400	8:8:4	256	11.2	GDDR3	64	2.2	4.4	31.2	10	3.3	n/a	23	2× DisplayPort or 2× DVI-D
NVS 300	Jan 8, 2011	GT218	40	PCIe x1/x16	589	1402	1580	16:8:4	512	12.64	DDR3	64	2.356	4.712	67.3	10.1	3.3	n/a	17.5	DMS-59
NVS 310	Jun 26, 2012	GF119	40	PCIe x16	523	1046	1750	48:8:4	512	14	DDR3	64	2.092	4.184	100.4	11.0	4.1	n/a	19.5	2× DisplayPort
NVS 315	Mar 10, 2013	GF119	40	PCIe x16	523	1046	1750	48:8:4	1,024	14	DDR3	64	2.092	4.184		11.0	4.1	n/a	19.5	DMS-59 Idle Power Consumption 7 W
NVS 400	Jul 16, 2004	2× NV17	150	PCI	220	220	332	2× 0:2:4:2	2× 64	2× 11.0	DDR	2× 128	2× 0.44	2× 0.88	2× 5.328	7	1.2	n/a	18	2× LFH-60
NVS 420	Jan 20, 2009	2xG98-850-U2	65	PCIe x1/x16	550	1300	1400	2× 8:8:4	2× 256	2× 11.2	GDDR3	2× 64	2× 2.2	2× 4.4	2× 31.2	10	3.3	n/a	40	through VHDCI to (4× DisplayPort or 4× DVI-D)
NVS 440	Feb 14, 2006	2xNV43	110	PCIe x1/x16	250		500	2× 4:8:8:8	2× 128	2× 8.000	DDR	2× 128	2× 2.000	2× 2.000		9.0	2.1	n/a	31	2× DMS-59
NVS 450	Nov 11, 2008	2xG98	65	PCIe x1/x16	550	1300	1400	2× 8:8:4	2× 256	2× 11.2	GDDR3	2× 64	2× 2.2	2× 4.4	2× 31.2	10	3.3	n/a	35	4× DisplayPort
NVS 510	Oct 23, 2012	GK107	28	PCIe 2.0 x16	797		1782	192:16:8 (1 SMX)	2,048	28.5	DDR3	128	3.188	12.75	306.0	11.0	4.6	1.2	35	4× miniDisplayPort
NVS 810	Nov 4, 2015	2× GM107	28	PCIe 3.0 x16	1033		1800	2× 512:32:16	2× 2,048	2× 14.4	DDR3	2× 64	16.53	33.06	1058	11.0	4.6	1.3	68	8× miniDisplayPort

=== Mobility Quadro NVS series ===
- ^{1} Vertex shaders: pixel shaders: texture mapping units: render output units
- ^{2} Unified shaders: texture mapping units: render output units

Model	Launch	Code name	Fab (nm)	Bus interface	Core clock (MHz)	Shader clock (MHz)	Memory clock (MHz)	Core config^{12}	Memory				Fillrate		Processing power (GFLOPS)	Supported API version		TDP (Watts)	Notes
Model	Launch	Code name	Fab (nm)	Bus interface	Core clock (MHz)	Shader clock (MHz)	Memory clock (MHz)	Core config^{12}	Size (MiB)	Bandwidth (GB/s)	Bus type	Bus width (bit)	Pixel (GP/s)	Texture (GT/s)	Single precision	Direct3D	OpenGL	TDP (Watts)	Notes
Quadro NVS 110M	Jun 1, 2006	G72M	90	PCIe 1.0 x16	300	300	600	3:4:4:2	Up to 512	4.8	DDR	64	0.6	1.2		9.0c	2.1	10	
Quadro NVS 120M	Jun 1, 2006	G72GLM	90	PCIe 1.0 x16	450	450	700	3:4:4:2	Up to 512	5.6	DDR2	64	0.9	1.8		9.0c	2.1	10	
Quadro NVS 130M	May 9, 2007	G86M	80	PCIe 2.0 x16	400?	800?	700	8:4:4	Up to 256	6.4?	DDR2	64	1.6?	1.6?	19.2	10.0	3.3	10	
Quadro NVS 135M	May 9, 2007	G86M	80	PCIe 2.0 x16	400	800	1188	16:8:4	Up to 256	9.504	GDDR3	64	1.6	3.2	38.4	10.0	3.3	10	
Quadro NVS 140M	May 9, 2007	G86M	80	PCIe 2.0 x16	400	800	1200	16:8:4	Up to 512	9.6	GDDR3	64	1.6	3.2	38.4	10.0	3.3	10	
Quadro NVS 150M	Aug 15, 2008	G98M	65	PCIe 2.0 x16	530	1300	1400	8:4:4	Up to 256	11.2	GDDR3	64	2.12	2.12	31.2	10.0	3.3	10	
Quadro NVS 160M	Aug 15, 2008	G98M	65	PCIe 2.0 x16	580	1450	1400	8:8:4	256	11.2	GDDR3	64	2.12	4.24	34.8	10.0	3.3	12	
Quadro NVS 300M	May 24, 2006	G72GLM	90	PCIe 1.0 x16	450	450	1000	3:4:4:2	Up to 512	8	DDR2	64	0.9	1.8		9.0c	2.1	16	
Quadro NVS 320M	Jun 9, 2007	G84M	65	PCIe 2.0 x16	575	1150	1400	32:16:8	Up to 512	22.4	GDDR3	128	4.6	9.2	110.4	10.0	3.3	20	
Quadro NVS 510M	Aug 21, 2006	G72GLM	90	PCIe 1.0 x16	500	500	1200	8:24:24:16	Up to 1,024	38.4	GDDR3	256	8	12		9.0c	2.1	45?	based on Go 7900 GTX

=== Mobility NVS series ===
- ^{1}Unified shaders: texture mapping units: render output units

Model	Launch	Code name	Fab (nm)	Bus interface	Core clock (MHz)	Shader clock (MHz)	Memory clock (MHz)	Core config^{1}	Memory				Fillrate		Processing power (GFLOPS)	Supported API version				TDP (Watts)	Notes
Model	Launch	Code name	Fab (nm)	Bus interface	Core clock (MHz)	Shader clock (MHz)	Memory clock (MHz)	Core config^{1}	Size (MiB)	Bandwidth (GB/s)	Bus type	Bus width (bit)	Pixel (GP/s)	Texture (GT/s)	Single precision	Direct3D	OpenGL	OpenCL	CUDA	TDP (Watts)	Notes
NVS 2100M	Jan 7, 2010	GT218M	40	PCIe 2.0 x16	535	1230	1600	16:8:4	Up to 512	12.8	GDDR3	64	2.14	4.28	59.04	10.1	3.3	1.1	1.2	14	
NVS 3100M	Jan 7, 2010	GT218M	40	PCIe 2.0 x16	600	1470	1600	16:8:4	Up to 512	12.8	GDDR3	64	2.4	4.8	70.56	10.1	3.3	1.1	1.2	14	based on G210M/310M
NVS 4200M	Jan 7, 2010	GF119	40	PCIe 2.0 x16	810	1620	1600	48:8:4	Up to 1,024	12.8	GDDR3	64	3.24	6.48	155.52	11	4.5	1.1	2.1	25	based on GT 520M
NVS 5100M	Feb 22, 2011	GT216M	40	PCIe 2.0 x16	550	1210	1600	48:16:8	Up to 1,024	25.6	GDDR3	128	4.4	8.8	174.24	10.1	3.3	1.1	1.2	35	
NVS 5200M	Jun 1, 2012	GF108 GF117	40/28	PCIe 2.0 x16	625	1250	1800	96:16:4	Up to 1,024	14.4	GDDR3	64	2.5	10	240	11	4.5	1.1	2.1	35	
NVS 5400M	Jun 1, 2012	GF108 GF117	40/28	PCIe 2.0 x16	660	1320	1800	96:16:4	Up to 1,024	28.8	GDDR3	128	2.64	10.56	253.44	11	4.5	1.1	2.1	35	

=== Quadro ===
- ^{1} Vertex shaders: pixel shaders: texture mapping units: render output units

Model	Code name	Fab (nm)	Bus interface	Core clock (MHz)	Memory clock (MHz)	Core config^{1}	Memory				Fillrate		Supported API version		TDP (Watts)	Notes
Model	Code name	Fab (nm)	Bus interface	Core clock (MHz)	Memory clock (MHz)	Core config^{1}	Size (MiB)	Bandwidth (GB/s)	Bus type	Bus width (bit)	Pixel (GP/s)	Texture (GT/s)	Direct3D	OpenGL	TDP (Watts)	Notes
Quadro	NV10GL	220	AGP 4x	135	166	0:4:4:4	64	2.66	SDR	128	0.54	0.54	7	1.2		
Quadro DDR	NV10GL	220	AGP 4x	135	333	0:4:4:4	64	5.312	DDR	128	0.54	0.54	7	1.2		
Quadro2 MXR	NV11GL	180	AGP 4x	200	183	0:2:4:2	64	2.93	SDR	128	0.4	0.4	7	1.2		
Quadro2 EX	NV11GL	180	AGP 4x	175	166	0:2:4:2	64	2.7	SDR	128	0.35	0.35	7	1.2		
Quadro2 PRO	NV15GL	150	AGP 4x	250	400	0:4:8:4	64	6.4	DDR	128	1	2	7	1.2		
Quadro DCC	NV20GL	180	AGP 4x	200	460	1:4:8:4	128	7.4	DDR	128	0.8	1.6	8.0	1.3		
Quadro4 380XGL	NV18GL	150	AGP 8x	275	513	0:2:4:2	128	8.2	DDR	128	0.55	1.1	7	1.2		
Quadro4 500XGL	NV17GL	150	AGP 4x	250	166	0:2:4:2	128	2.7	SDR	128	0.5	1	7	1.2		
Quadro4 550XGL	NV17GL	150	AGP 4x	270	400	0:2:4:2	64	6.4	DDR	128	0.59	1.08	7	1.2		
Quadro4 580XGL	NV18GL	150	AGP 8x	300	400	0:2:4:2	64	6.4	DDR	128	0.6	1.2	7	1.2		
Quadro4 700XGL	NV25	150	AGP 4x	275	550	2:4:8:4	64	8.8	DDR	128	1.1	2.2	8.1	1.3		
Quadro4 750XGL	NV25	150	AGP 4x	275	550	2:4:8:4	128	8.8	DDR	128	1.1	2.2	8.1	1.3		Stereo display
Quadro4 900XGL	NV25	150	AGP 4x	300	650	2:4:8:4	128	10.4	DDR	128	1.2	2.4	8.1	1.3		Stereo display
Quadro4 980XGL	NV28GL	150	AGP 8x	300	650	2:4:8:4	128	10.4	DDR	128	1.2	2.4	8.1	1.3		Stereo display
Model	Code name	Fab (nm)	Bus interface	Core clock (MHz)	Memory clock (MHz)	Core config^{1}	Size (MiB)	Bandwidth (GB/s)	Bus type	Bus width (bit)	Pixel (GP/s)	Texture (GT/s)	Direct3D	OpenGL	TDP (Watts)	Features
Model	Code name	Fab (nm)	Bus interface	Core clock (MHz)	Memory clock (MHz)	Core config^{1}	Memory				Fillrate		Supported API version		TDP (Watts)	Features

=== Quadro Go (GL) & Quadro FX Go series ===
Early mobile Quadro chips based on the GeForce2 Go up to GeForce Go 6800. Precise specifications on these old mobile workstation chips are very hard to find, and conflicting between Nvidia press releases and product lineups in GPU databases like TechPowerUp's GPUDB.

- ^{1} Vertex shaders: pixel shaders: texture mapping units: render output units
- ^{2} Unified shaders: texture mapping units: render output units

Model	Launch	Code name	Fab (nm)	Bus interface	Core clock (MHz)	Memory clock (MHz)	Core config^{12}	Memory				Fillrate		Supported API version		TDP (Watts)	Notes
Model	Launch	Code name	Fab (nm)	Bus interface	Core clock (MHz)	Memory clock (MHz)	Core config^{12}	Size (MiB)	Bandwidth (GB/s)	Bus type	Bus width (bit)	Pixel (GP/s)	Texture (GT/s)	Direct3D	OpenGL	TDP (Watts)	Notes
Quadro2 Go	August 14, 2001	NV11 GLM	180	AGP 4x	143	130; 360	2:0:4:2	32; 64	2.9; 5.8	SDR; DDR	128	0.286	0.592	7.0	1.2		First mobile Quadro based on the GeForce2 Go, Dynamic core clock 100–143 MHz, dynamic voltage 1.575V, graphics core listed as 64-bit and 128-bit for DDR and SDR SDRAM types, respectively, according to Nvidia
Quadro4 500 Go GL	April 23, 2002	NV17 GLM	150	AGP 4x,8x	220	220	2:0:4:2	64	7.0	DDR	128	0.44	0.88	7.0	1.2		Based on the GeForce4 Go, dynamic core clock 66–220 MHz, core voltage 1.35 V, uses DDR SDRAM according to Nvidia brochures
Quadro4 700 Go GL	February 5, 2003	NV28 GLM	150	AGP 4x,8x	176	200	4:2:4:4	64	7.4?	DDR	128?	0.704	0.704	8.1	1.3		Based on GeForce4 Go 4200, uses DDR according to Nvidia brochures
Quadro FX Go 700		NV31 GLM	130	AGP 8x	295	590	4:2:4:4	128	9.44?	DDR	128	1.18	1.18	9.0	2.1?		Slightly underclocked Geforce FX 5600 Go
Quadro FX Go 1000	February 2004?	NV36 GLM	130?	AGP 8x	295	570	4:3:4:4	128	9.12?	DDR	128	1.18	1.18	9.0	2.1?		Based on TSMC 130 nm process with one extra pixel shader?
Quadro FX Go 1400	February 25, 2005	NV41 GLM	130	PCIe	275	590	12:5:12:12?	256	18.9?F	DDR	256	2.20	2.2	9.0	2.1?		Last chip designated as a Quadro FX Go, uses PCIe instead of AGP 8x. Core config has been mentioned as either 8:5:8:8 or 12:5:12:12 - the latter is likely since chip is derived from GeForce Go 6800.

=== Quadro FX series ===
- ^{1} Vertex shaders: pixel shaders: texture mapping units: render output units

Model	Code name	Fab (nm)	Bus interface	Core clock (MHz)	Memory clock (MHz)	Core config^{1*}	Memory				Fillrate		Supported API version		TDP (Watts)	Notes
Model	Code name	Fab (nm)	Bus interface	Core clock (MHz)	Memory clock (MHz)	Core config^{1*}	Size (MiB)	Bandwidth (GB/s)	Bus type	Bus width (bit)	Pixel (GP/s)	Texture (GT/s)	Direct3D	OpenGL	TDP (Watts)	Notes
Quadro FX 500	NV34GL	150	AGP 8x	270	480	2:4:4:4	128	7.68	DDR	128	1.08	1.08	9.0	2.0		Stereo display
Quadro FX 600	NV34GL	150	PCI	350	480	2:4:4:4	128	7.68	DDR	128	1.4	1.4		2.0		Stereo display
Quadro FX 700	NV35GL	150	AGP 8x	275	550	3:4:8:4	128	8.8	DDR	128	1.1	2.2		2.0		Stereo display
Quadro FX 1000	NV30GL	130	AGP 8x	300	600	2:4:8:4	128	9.6	GDDR2	128	1.2	2.4		2.0		Stereo display
Quadro FX 1100	NV36GL	130	AGP 8x	425	650	3:4:4:4	128	10.4	DDR2	128	1.7	1.7		2.0		Stereo display
Quadro FX 2000	NV30GL	130	AGP 8x	400	800	2:4:8:4	128	12.8	GDDR2	128	1.6	3.2		2.0		Stereo display
Quadro FX 3000	NV35GL	130	AGP 8x	400	850	3:4:8:4	256	27.2	DDR	256	1.6	3.2		2.0		Stereo display
Quadro FX 3000G	NV35GL	130	AGP 8x	400	850	3:4:8:4	256	27.2	DDR	256	1.6	3.2		2.0		Stereo display, Genlock
Quadro FX 4000	NV40GL	130	AGP 8x	375	1000	6:12:12:12	256	32.0	GDDR3	256	4.5	4.5	9.0c	2.1	142	Stereo display
Quadro FX 4000 SDI	NV40GL	130	AGP 8x	375	1000	6:12:12:12	256	32.0	GDDR3	256	4.5	4.5		2.1		Stereo display, Genlock

=== Quadro FX (x300) series ===
- ^{1} Vertex shaders: pixel shaders: texture mapping units: render output units

Model	Code name	Fab (nm)	Bus interface	Core clock (MHz)	Memory clock (MHz)	Core config^{1}	Fillrate		Memory				Supported API version		TDP (Watts)
Model	Code name	Fab (nm)	Bus interface	Core clock (MHz)	Memory clock (MHz)	Core config^{1}	Pixel (GP/s)	Texture (GT/s)	Size (MiB)	Bandwidth (GB/s)	Bus type	Bus width (bit)	Direct3D	OpenGL	TDP (Watts)
Quadro FX 330	NV37GL	150	PCIe x16	250	400	2:4:4:4	1	1	64	3.2	DDR	128	9.0	2.0	21
Quadro FX 1300	NV38	130	PCIe x16	350	550	3:4:8:4	1.4	2.8	128	17.6	DDR	256	9.0	2.1	55

=== Quadro FX (x400) series ===
- ^{1} Vertex shaders: pixel shaders: texture mapping units: render output units

Model	Code name	Fab (nm)	Bus interface	Core clock (MHz)	Memory clock (MHz)	Core config^{1}	Memory				Fillrate		Supported API version		TDP (Watts)	Notes
Model	Code name	Fab (nm)	Bus interface	Core clock (MHz)	Memory clock (MHz)	Core config^{1}	Size (MiB)	Bandwidth (GB/s)	Bus type	Bus width (bit)	Pixel (GP/s)	Texture (GT/s)	Direct3D	OpenGL	TDP (Watts)	Notes
Quadro FX 540	NV43GL	90	PCIe x16	300	550	4:8:8:8	128	8.8	GDDR3	128	2.4	2.4	9.0c	2.1	35	
Quadro FX 1400	NV41	130	PCIe x16	350	600	5:8:8:8	128	19.2	DDR	256	2.8	2.8	9.0c	2.1	75	Stereo display, SLI
Quadro FX 3400	NV45GL/ NV40	130	PCIe x16	350	900	5:12:12:12	256	28.8	GDDR3	256	4.2	4.2	9.0c	2.1	101	Stereo display, SLI
Quadro FX 3450	NV41	110	PCIe x16	425	1000	5:12:12:12	256	32.0	GDDR3	256	5.1	5.1	9.0c	2.1	83	Stereo display, SLI
Quadro FX 4400	NV45GL A3/ NV40	130	PCIe x16	400	1050	6:16:16:16	512	33.7	GDDR3	256	6.4	6.4	9.0c	2.1	110	Stereo display, SLI

=== Quadro FX (x500) series ===
- ^{1} Vertex shaders: pixel shaders: texture mapping units: render output units

Model	Code name	Fab (nm)	Bus interface	Core clock (MHz)	Memory clock (MHz)	Core config^{1}	Memory				Fillrate		Supported API version		TDP (Watts)	Notes
Model	Code name	Fab (nm)	Bus interface	Core clock (MHz)	Memory clock (MHz)	Core config^{1}	Size (MiB)	Bandwidth (GB/s)	Bus type	Bus width (bit)	Pixel (GP/s)	Texture (GT/s)	Direct3D	OpenGL	TDP (Watts)	Notes
Quadro FX 350	G72	90	PCIe x16	550	400	3:4:4:2	128	6.4	DDR2	64	1.1	2.2	9.0c	2.1	21	
Quadro FX 550	NV43	110	PCIe x16	360	400	4:8:8:8	128	12.8	GDDR3	128	2.88	2.88		2.1	30	
Quadro FX 1500	G71	90	PCIe x16	325	625	6:16:16:16	256	40.0	GDDR3	256	5.2	5.2		2.1	65	
Quadro FX 3500	G71	90	PCIe x16	450	660	7:20:20:16	256	42.2	GDDR3	256	7.2	9		2.1	80	Stereo display, SLI
Quadro FX 4500	G70	110	PCIe x16	430	525	8:24:24:16	512	33.6	GDDR3	256	6.88	10.3		2.1	109	Stereo display, SLI
Quadro FX 4500 SDI	G70	110	PCIe x16	430	525	8:24:24:16	512	33.6	GDDR3	256	6.88	10.3		2.1	116	Stereo display, Genlock
Quadro FX 4500X2	G71	90	PCIe x16	500	605	2× 8:24:24:16	2x 512	2x 38.7	GDDR3	2x 256	2x 8	2x 12		2.1	145	Stereo display, SLI, Genlock
Quadro FX 4500 rev. A2	G71	90	PCIe x16	650	800	8:24:24:16	512	51.2	GDDR3	256	10.4	15.6		2.1	105	Stereo display, SLI, Genlock
Quadro FX 5500	G71	90	PCIe x16	650	505	8:24:24:16	1,024	32.3	DDR2	256	10.4	15.6		2.1	96	Stereo display, SLI, Genlock
Quadro FX 5500 SDI	G71	90	PCIe x16	650	505	8:24:24:16	1,024	32.3	DDR2	256	10.4	15.6		2.1	104	Stereo display, SLI, Genlock

Quadro FX (x500M) series. GeForce 7-Series based.

Model	Launch	Code name	Fab (nm)	Bus interface	Core clock (MHz)	Memory clock (MHz)	Core config^{1}	Memory				Fillrate		Supported API version		TDP (Watts)
Model	Launch	Code name	Fab (nm)	Bus interface	Core clock (MHz)	Memory clock (MHz)	Core config^{1}	Size (MiB)	Bandwidth (GB/s)	Bus type	Bus width (bit)	Pixel (GP/s)	Texture (GT/s)	Direct3D	OpenGL	TDP (Watts)
Quadro FX 350M	Mar 13, 2006	G72GLM	90	PCIe 1.0 x16	450	900	3:4:4:2	256	14.4	GDDR3	128	0.9	1.8	9.0c	2.1	15
Quadro FX 1500M	Apr 18, 2006	G71GLM	90	PCIe 1.0 x16	375	1000	8:24:24:16	512	32	GDDR3	256	6	9	9.0c	2.1	15
Quadro FX 2500M	Sep 29, 2005	G71GLM	90	PCIe 1.0 x16	500	1200	8:24:24:16	512	38.4	GDDR3	256	8	12	9.0c	2.1	15
Quadro FX 3500M	Mar 1, 2007	G71GLM	90	PCIe 1.0 x16	575	1200	8:24:24:16	512	38.4	GDDR3	256	9.2	13.8	9.0c	2.1	15

=== Quadro FX (x600) series ===
- ^{1} Vertex shaders: pixel shaders: texture mapping units: render output units
- ^{2} Unified shaders: texture mapping units: render output units

Model	Launch	Code name	Fab (nm)	Bus interface	Core clock (MHz)	Shader clock (MHz)	Memory clock (MHz)	Core config^{12}	Memory				Fillrate		Processing power (GFLOPS)		Supported API version				TDP (Watts)	Notes
Model	Launch	Code name	Fab (nm)	Bus interface	Core clock (MHz)	Shader clock (MHz)	Memory clock (MHz)	Core config^{12}	Size (MiB)	Bandwidth (GB/s)	Bus type	Bus width (bit)	Pixel (GP/s)	Texture (GT/s)	Single precision	Double precision	Direct3D	OpenGL	OpenCL	CUDA	TDP (Watts)	Notes
Quadro FX 560	Apr 20, 2006	G73GL	90	PCIe x16	350	350	1200	5:12:12:8	128	19.2	GDDR3	128	2.8	4.2			9.0c	2.1	-	-	30	
Quadro FX 4600^{2}	Mar 5, 2007	G80-850-A2 + NVIO-1-A3	90	PCIe x16	500	1200	1400	96:24:24	768	67.2	GDDR3	384	12	24	345	-	10.0	3.3	1.1	1.0	134	Stereo display, SLI, Genlock
Quadro FX 4600 SDI^{2}	Mar 5, 2007	G80-850-A2 + NVIO-1-A3	90	PCIe x16	500	1200	1400	96:24:24	768	67.2	GDDR3	384	12	24	345	-	10.0	3.3	1.1	1.0	154	Stereo display, SLI, Genlock
Quadro FX 5600^{2}	Mar 5, 2007	G80-875-A2 + NVIO-1-A3	90	PCIe 2.0 x16	600	1350	1600	128:32:24	1,536	76.8	GDDR3	384	14.4	38.4	518.4	-	10.0	3.3	-	-	171	Stereo display, SLI, Genlock

GeForce 8-Series (except FX 560M and FX 3600M) based. First Quadro Mobile line to support Direct3D 10.

- ^{1}Unified shaders: texture mapping units: render output units

Model	Launch	Code name	Fab (nm)	Bus interface	Core clock (MHz)	Shader clock (MHz)	Memory clock (MHz)	Core config^{1}	Memory				Fillrate		Processing power (GFLOPS)	Supported API version		TDP (Watts)	Notes
Model	Launch	Code name	Fab (nm)	Bus interface	Core clock (MHz)	Shader clock (MHz)	Memory clock (MHz)	Core config^{1}	Size (MiB)	Bandwidth (GB/s)	Bus type	Bus width (bit)	Pixel (GP/s)	Texture (GT/s)	Single precision	Direct3D	OpenGL	TDP (Watts)	Notes
Quadro FX 360M	May 9, 2007	G86M	80	PCIe 1.0 x16	400	800	1200	16:8:4	256	9.6	DDR2	64	1.6	3.2	38.4	10.0	3.3	17	Based on the GeForce 8400M GS
Quadro FX 560M	Apr 20, 2006	G73GLM	90	PCIe 1.0 x16	500	500	1200	5:12:12:8	512	19.2	GDDR3	128	4	6		9.0c	2.1	35?	7600GS based?
Quadro FX 1600M	Jun 1, 2007	G84M	80	PCIe 1.0 x16	625	1250	1600	32:16:8	512	25.6	GDDR3	128	5	10	120	10.0	3.3	50?	
Quadro FX 3600M	Feb 23, 2008	G92M	65	PCIe 1.0 x16	500	1250	1600	64:32:16; 96:48:16	512	51.2	GDDR3	256	8; 8	16; 24	240; 360	10.0	3.3	70	Based on the GeForce 8800M GTX. Dell Precision M6300 uses 64 shader version of the FX 3600M

=== Quadro FX (x700) series ===
- ^{1}Unified shaders: texture mapping units: render output units

Model	Launch	Code name	Fab (nm)	Bus interface	Core clock (MHz)	Shader clock (MHz)	Memory clock (MHz)	Core config^{1}	Memory				Fillrate		Processing power (GFLOPS)		Supported API version				TDP (Watts)	Notes
Model	Launch	Code name	Fab (nm)	Bus interface	Core clock (MHz)	Shader clock (MHz)	Memory clock (MHz)	Core config^{1}	Size (MiB)	Bandwidth (GB/s)	Bus type	Bus width (bit)	Pixel (GP/s)	Texture (GT/s)	Single precision	Double precision	Direct3D	OpenGL	OpenCL	CUDA	TDP (Watts)	Notes
Quadro FX 370	Sep 12, 2007	G84-825-A2	80	PCIe x16	360	720	800	16:8:4	256	6.4	DDR2	64	1.44	2.88	34.56	-	10.0	3.3	1.1	1.1	35	
Quadro FX 370 LP	Nov 6, 2008	G98	80	PCIe x16	540	1300	1000	8:8:4	256	8	DDR2	64	2.16	4.32	25.92	-	10.0	3.3	1.1	1.1	25	DMS-59 for two Single Link DVI
Quadro FX 470	Sep 12, 2007	MCP7A-U	65	PCIe 2.0 x16 (Integrated)	580	1400	800 (system memory)	16:8:4	Up to 256 MiB from system memory	12.8	DDR2	128	2.32	4.64	67.2	-	10.0	3.3	-	-	30	based on GeForce 9400 mGPU
Quadro FX 570	Sep 12, 2007	G84-850-A2	80	PCIe x16	460	920	800	16:8:8	256	12.8	DDR2	128	3.68	3.68	44.1	-	10.0	3.3	1.1	1.1	38	
Quadro FX 1700	Sep 12, 2007	G84-875-A2	80	PCIe x16	460	920	800	32:16:8	512	12.8	DDR2	128	3.68	7.36	88.32	-	10.0	3.3	1.1	1.1	42	
Quadro FX 3700	Jan 8, 2008	G92-875-A2	65	PCIe 2.0 x16	500	1250	1600	112:56:16	512	51.2	GDDR3	256	8	28	420	-	10.0	3.3	1.1	1.1	78	Stereo display, SLI
Quadro FX 4700X2	Apr 18, 2008	2× G92-880-A2	65	PCIe 2.0 x16	600	1500	1600	2× 128:64:16	2× 1,024	2× 51.2	GDDR3	2× 256	2× 9.6	2× 38.4	2× 576	-	10.0	3.3	1.1	1.1	226	SLI
Quadro VX 200	Jan 8, 2008	G92-851-A2	65	PCIe 2.0 x16	450	1125	1600	96:48:16	512	51.2	GDDR3	256	7.2	21.6	324	-	10.0	3.3	1.1	1.1	75	2× Dual-link DVI, S-Video, optimised for Autodesk AutoCAD

Quadro FX (x700M) series.

Model	Launch	Code name	Fab (nm)	Bus interface	Core clock (MHz)	Shader clock (MHz)	Memory clock (MHz)	Core config^{1}	Memory				Fillrate		Processing power (GFLOPS)	Supported API version		TDP (Watts)
Model	Launch	Code name	Fab (nm)	Bus interface	Core clock (MHz)	Shader clock (MHz)	Memory clock (MHz)	Core config^{1}	Size (MiB)	Bandwidth (GB/s)	Bus type	Bus width (bit)	Pixel (GP/s)	Texture (GT/s)	Single precision	Direct3D	OpenGL	TDP (Watts)
Quadro FX 370M	Aug 15, 2008	G98M	65	PCIe 1.0 x16	550	1400	1200	8:4:4	256	9.6	GDDR3	64	2.2	2.2	33.6	10.0	3.3	20
Quadro FX 570M	Jun 1, 2007	G84M	80	PCIe 1.0 x16	475	950	1400	32:16:8	512	22.4	GDDR3	128	3.8	7.6	91.2	10.0	3.3	45
Quadro FX 770M	Aug 14, 2008	G96M	65	PCIe 1.0 x16	500	1250	1600	32:16:8	512	25.6	GDDR3	128	4	8	119.0	10.0	3.3	35
Quadro FX 1700M	Oct 1, 2008	G96M	65	PCIe 1.0 x16	625	1550	1600	32:16:8	512	25.6	GDDR3	128	5	10	148.8	10.0	3.3	50
Quadro FX 2700M	Aug 14, 2008	G94M	65	PCIe 1.0 x16	530	1325	1600	48:24:16	512	51.2	GDDR3	256	8.48	12.72	190.8	10.0	3.3	65
Quadro FX 3700M	Aug 14, 2008	G92M	65	PCIe 1.0 x16	530	1375	1600	128:64:16	1,024	51.2	GDDR3	256	8.8	35.2	528	10.0	3.3	75

=== Quadro FX (x800) series ===
- ^{1}Unified shaders: texture mapping units: render output units

Model	Launch	Code name	Fab (nm)	Bus interface	Core clock (MHz)	Shader clock (MHz)	Memory clock (MHz)	Core config^{1}	Memory				Fillrate		Processing power (GFLOPS)		Supported API version				TDP (Watts)	Notes
Model	Launch	Code name	Fab (nm)	Bus interface	Core clock (MHz)	Shader clock (MHz)	Memory clock (MHz)	Core config^{1}	Size (MiB)	Bandwidth (GB/s)	Bus type	Bus width (bit)	Pixel (GP/s)	Texture (GT/s)	Single precision	Double precision	Direct3D	OpenGL	OpenCL	CUDA	TDP (Watts)	Notes
Quadro FX 380	Mar 30, 2009	G96-850-C1	65	PCIe 2.0 x16	450	1100	1400	16:8:8	256	22.4	GDDR3	128	3.6	3.6	52.8	-	10.0	3.3	1.1	1.1	34	Two Dual Link DVI, no DisplayPort
Quadro FX 380 LP	Dec 1, 2009	GT218GL	40	PCIe 2.0 x16	589	1402	1600	16:8:4	512	12.8	GDDR3	64	2.356	4.712	67.296	-	10.0	3.3	1.1	1.2	28	DisplayPort, Dual Link DVI
Quadro FX 580	Apr 9, 2009	G96-875-C1	65	PCIe 2.0 x16	450	1125	1600	32:16:8	512	25.6	GDDR3	128	3.6	7.2	108	-	10.0	3.3	1.1	1.1	40	Dual DisplayPort, Dual Link DVI
Quadro FX 1800	Mar 30, 2009	G94-876-B1	65	PCIe 2.0 x16	550	1375	1600	64:32:12	768	38.4	GDDR3	192	6.6	17.6	264	-	10.0	3.3	1.1	1.1	59	Stereo DP Dual Link DVI, Dual DisplayPort, SLI
Quadro FX 3800	Mar 30, 2009	G200-835-B3 + NVIO2-A2	55	PCIe 2.0 x16	600	1204	1600	192:64:16	1,024	51.2	GDDR3	256	9.632	38.528	691.2	86.4	10.0	3.3	1.1	1.3	108	Stereo DP Dual Link DVI, Dual DisplayPort, SLI
Quadro FX 4800	Nov 11, 2008	G200-850-B3 + NVIO2-A2	55	PCIe 2.0 x16	602	1204	1600	192:64:24	1,536	76.8	GDDR3	384	14.448	38.528	693.504	86.688	10.0	3.3	1.1	1.3	150	Stereo DP Dual Link DVI, Dual DisplayPort, SLI
Quadro FX 5800	Nov 11, 2008	G200-875-B2 + NVIO2-A2	55	PCIe 2.0 x16	610	1296	1600	240:80:32	4,096	102.4	GDDR3	512	20.736	51.840	878.4	109.8	10.0	3.3	1.1	1.3	189	Stereo DP Dual Link DVI, Dual DisplayPort, SLI
Quadro CX	Nov 11, 2008	GT200GL + NVIO2	55	PCIe 2.0 x16	602	1204	1600	192:64:24	1,536	76.8	GDDR3	384	14.448	38.528	693.504	86.688	10.0	3.3	1.1	1.3	150	Display Port and dual-link DVI Output, optimised for Adobe Creative Suite 4

The last Direct3D 10 based Quadro mobile cards.

Model	Launch	Code name	Fab (nm)	Bus interface	Core clock (MHz)	Shader clock (MHz)	Memory clock (MHz)	Core config^{1}	Memory				Fillrate		Processing power (GFLOPS)	Supported API version		TDP (Watts)
Model	Launch	Code name	Fab (nm)	Bus interface	Core clock (MHz)	Shader clock (MHz)	Memory clock (MHz)	Core config^{1}	Size (MiB)	Bandwidth (GB/s)	Bus type	Bus width (bit)	Pixel (GP/s)	Texture (GT/s)	Single precision	Direct3D	OpenGL	TDP (Watts)
Quadro FX 380M	Jan 7, 2010	GT218M	40	PCIe 2.0 x16	625	1530	1600	16:8:4	512	12.8	GDDR3	64	2.5	5	73.44	10.1	3.3	25
Quadro FX 880M	Jan 7, 2010	GT216M	40	PCIe 2.0 x16	550	1210	1600	48:16:8	1,024	25.6	GDDR3	128	4.4	8.8	174.24	10.1	3.3	35
Quadro FX 1800M	Jun 15, 2009	GT215M	40	PCIe 2.0 x16	450	1080	1600; 2200	72:24:8	1,024	25.6; 35.2	GDDR3; GDDR5	128	3.6	10.8	233.28	10.1	3.3	45
Quadro FX 2800M	Dec 1, 2009	G92M	55	PCIe 2.0 x16	500	1250	2000	96:48:16	1,024	64	GDDR3	256	8	16	360	10.0	3.3	75
Quadro FX 3800M	Aug 14, 2008	G92M	55	PCIe 2.0 x16	675	1688	2000	128:64:16	1,024	64	GDDR3	256	10.8	43.2	648.192	10.0	3.3	100

=== Quadro x000 series ===
- ^{1} Unified shaders: texture mapping units: render output units
- ^{4} Each SM in the Fermi architecture contains 4 texture filtering units for every texture address unit. Total for the full GF100 64 texture address units and 256 texture filtering units

Model	Launch	Code name	Fab (nm)	Bus interface	Core clock (MHz)	Shader clock (MHz)	Memory clock (MHz)	Core config^{1}	Memory				Fillrate		Processing power (GFLOPS)		Supported API version				TDP (Watts)	Notes
Model	Launch	Code name	Fab (nm)	Bus interface	Core clock (MHz)	Shader clock (MHz)	Memory clock (MHz)	Core config^{1}	Size (GiB)	Bandwidth (GB/s)	Bus type	Bus width (bit)	Pixel (GP/s)	Texture (GT/s)	Single precision	Double precision	Direct3D	OpenGL	OpenCL	CUDA	TDP (Watts)	Notes
Quadro 400	Apr 5, 2011	GT216GL	40	PCIe 2.0 x16	450	1125	1540	48:16:4	0.5	12.3	DDR3	64	1.8	7.2	108	-	10.1	4.5	1.1	1.2	32	DisplayPort, Dual Link DVI
Quadro 600	Dec 13, 2010	GF108GL	40	PCIe 2.0 x16	640	1280	1600	96:16^{4}:4	1	25.6	DDR3	128	2.56	10.24	245.76	15	11.0	4.6	1.1	2.1	40	DisplayPort, Dual Link DVI
Quadro 2000	Dec 24, 2010	GF106GL (GF106-875)	40	PCIe 2.0 x16	625	1250	2600	192:32^{4}:16	1	41.6	GDDR5	128	10	20	480	30	11.0	4.6	1.1	2.1	62	Stereo DP Dual Link DVI, Dual DisplayPort
Quadro 4000	Nov 2, 2010	GF100	40	PCIe 2.0 x16	475	950	2800	256:32^{4}:32	2	89.6	GDDR5	256	15.2	15.2	486.4	243	11.0	4.6	1.1	2.0	142	
Quadro 5000	Feb 23, 2011	GF100	40	PCIe 2.0 x16	513	1026	3000	352:44^{4}:40	2.5	120	GDDR5	320	20.53	22.572	722.304	359	11.0	4.6	1.1	2.0	152	
Quadro 6000	Dec 10, 2010	GF100	40	PCIe 2.0 x16	574	1148	3000	448:56^{4}:48	6	144	GDDR5	384	27.552	32.144	1028.608	515	11.0	4.6	1.1	2.0	204	
Quadro 7000	May 2, 2012	GF110	40	PCIe 2.0 x16	651	1301	3696	512:64^{4}:48	6	177	GDDR5	384	31.248	41.7	1332	667	11.0	4.6	1.1	2.0	204	
Quadro Plex 7000	July 25, 2011	2× GF100	40	PCIe 2.0 x16	574	1148	3000	2× 512:64^{4}:48	2× 6	2× 144	GDDR5	2× 384	2× 18.37	2× 36.74	2× 1176	2× 588	11.0	4.6	1.1	2.0	600	

Mobile version of the Quadro x000 series.

Model	Launch	Code name	Fab (nm)	Bus interface	Core clock (MHz)	Shader clock (MHz)	Memory clock (MHz)	Core config^{12}	Memory				Fillrate		Processing power (GFLOPS)	Supported API version		TDP (Watts)	Notes
Model	Launch	Code name	Fab (nm)	Bus interface	Core clock (MHz)	Shader clock (MHz)	Memory clock (MHz)	Core config^{12}	Size (GiB)	Bandwidth (GB/s)	Bus type	Bus width (bit)	Pixel (GP/s)	Texture (GT/s)	Single precision	Direct3D	OpenGL	TDP (Watts)	Notes
Quadro 500M	Feb 22, 2011	GF108	40	PCIe 2.0 x16	700	1400	1800	96:16:4	1	28.8	DDR3	128	2.8	11.2	268.8	11.0	4.5	35	
Quadro 1000M	Jan 13, 2011	GF108	40	PCIe 2.0 x16	700	1400	1800	96:16:4	2	28.8	DDR3	128	2.8	11.2		11.0	4.5	45	Dell Precision M4600
Quadro 2000M	Jan 13, 2011	GF106	40	PCIe 2.0 x16	550	1100	1800	192:32:16	2	28.8	DDR3	128	8.8	17.6	422.4	11.0	4.5	55	Dell Precision M4600
Quadro 3000M	Feb 22, 2011	GF104	40	PCIe 2.0 x16	450	900	2500	240:40:32	2	80	GDDR5	256	14.4	18	432	11.0	4.5	75	Dell Precision M6600
Quadro 4000M	Feb 22, 2011	GF104	40	PCIe 2.0 x16	475	950	2500	336:56:32	2	80	GDDR5	256	15.2	26.6	638.4	11.0	4.5	100	Dell Precision M6600
Quadro 5000M	Jul 27, 2010	GF100	40	PCIe 2.0 x16	405	810	2400	320:40:32	2	76.8	GDDR5	256	12.96	16.2	518.4	11.0	4.5	100	Dell Precision M6500
Quadro 5010M	Feb 22, 2011	GF110	40	PCIe 2.0 x16	450	900	2600	384:48:32	4	83.2	GDDR5	256	14.4	21.6	691.2	11.0	4.5	100	Dell Precision M6600

=== Quadro Kxxx series ===
- ^{1}Unified shaders: texture mapping units: render output units

Model	Launch	Code name	Fab (nm)	Bus interface	Core clock (MHz)	Shader clock (MHz)	Memory clock (MHz)	Core config^{1}	Cache		Memory				Fillrate		Processing power (GFLOPS)		Supported API version				TDP (Watts)	Notes
Model	Launch	Code name	Fab (nm)	Bus interface	Core clock (MHz)	Shader clock (MHz)	Memory clock (MHz)	Core config^{1}	L1/SM (KiB)	L2 (MiB)	Size (GiB)	Bandwidth (GB/s)	Bus type	Bus width (bit)	Pixel (GP/s)	Texture (GT/s)	Single precision	Double precision	Direct3D	OpenGL	Vulkan	CUDA	TDP (Watts)	Notes
Quadro 410	Aug 7, 2012	GK107	28	PCIe 2.0 x16	706	706	1800	192:16:8 (1 SMX)	16	0.125	0.5	14.4	DDR3	64	5.65	11.3	271.1	11.30	11.0	4.6	1.2	3.0	38	
Quadro K600	Mar 1, 2013	GK107	28	PCIe 2.0 x16	876	876	891 (1782)	192:16:16 (1 SMX)	16	0.25	1	28.5	DDR3	128	14.0	14.0	336.4	14.02	11.0	4.6	1.2	3.0	41	6.3" Card
Quadro K2000	Mar 1, 2013	GK107	28	PCIe 2.0 x16	954	954	1000 (4000)	384:32:16 (2 SMX)	16	0.25	2	64	GDDR5	128	15.2	30.5	732.7	30.53	11.0	4.6	1.2	3.0	51	7.97" Card
Quadro K2000D	Mar 1, 2013	GK107	28	PCIe 2.0 x16	954	954	1000 (4000)	384:32:16 (2 SMX)	16	0.25	2	64	GDDR5	128	15.2	30.5	732.7	30.53	11.0	4.6	1.2	3.0	51	7.97" Card
Quadro K4000	Mar 1, 2013	GK106	28	PCIe 2.0 x16	810.5	810.5	1404 (5616)	768:64:24 (4 SMX)	16	0.375	3	134.8	GDDR5	192	19.4	51.9	1245	51.84	11.0	4.6	1.2	3.0	80	9.5" Card
Quadro K5000	Aug 17, 2012	GK104	28	PCIe 2.0 x16	706	706	1350 (5400)	1536:128:32 (8 SMX)	16	0.5	4	172.8	GDDR5	256	22.6	90.4	2169	90.4	11.0	4.6	1.2	3.0	122	10.5" Card
Quadro K6000	Jul 23, 2013	GK110	28	PCIe 3.0 x16	901.5	901.5	1502 (6008)	2880:240:48 (15 SMX)	16	1.5	12	288	GDDR5	384	54.1	216	5196	1732	11.0	4.6	1.2	3.5	225	10.5" Card

Model	Launch	Code name	Fab (nm)	Bus interface	Core clock (MHz)	Shader clock (MHz)	Memory clock (MHz)	Core config^{1}	Cache		Memory				Fillrate		Processing power (GFLOPS)		Supported API version				TDP (Watts)	Notes
Model	Launch	Code name	Fab (nm)	Bus interface	Core clock (MHz)	Shader clock (MHz)	Memory clock (MHz)	Core config^{1}	L1/SM (KiB)	L2 (MiB)	Size (GiB)	Bandwidth (GB/s)	Bus type	Bus width (bit)	Pixel (GP/s)	Texture (GT/s)	Single precision	Double precision	Direct3D	OpenGL	Vulkan	CUDA	TDP (Watts)	Notes
Quadro K420	Jul 22, 2014	GK107	28	PCIe 2.0 x16	780	780	1800	192:16:16 (1 SMX)	16	0.25	1 2	29	DDR3	128	12.48	12.48	299.52	12.48	11.0	4.6	1.2	3.0	41	
Quadro K620	Jul 22, 2014	GM107-850	28	PCIe 2.0 x16	1000	1000	900 (1800)	384:24:16 (3 SMM)	64	2	2	28.8	DDR3	128	16.0	24.0	768.0	24.0	12.0	4.6	1.3	5.0	45	6.3" Card
Quadro K1200	Jan 28, 2015	GM107-860	28	PCIe 2.0 x16	954	954	1253	512:32:16 (4 SMM)	64	2	4	80.2	GDDR5	128	15.3	30.5	1083	33.1	12.0	4.6	1.3	5.0	45	7.97" Card
Quadro K2200	Jul 22, 2014	GM107-875-A2	28	PCIe 2.0 x16	1046	1046	1253 (5012)	640:40:16 (5 SMM)	64	2	4	80.2	GDDR5	128	16.7	41.8	1338.9	41.8	12.0	4.6	1.3	5.0	68	7.97" Card
Quadro K4200	Jul 22, 2014	GK104	28	PCIe 2.0 x16	780	780	1350 (5400)	1344:112:32 (7 SMX)	16	0.5	4	172.8	GDDR5	256	24.96	87.36	2096.64	87.36	11.0	4.6	1.2	3.0	105	9.5" Card
Quadro K5200	Jul 22, 2014	GK110B	28	PCIe 3.0 x16	650	650	1500 (6000)	2304:192:32 (12 SMX)	16	1.5	8	192	GDDR5	256	20.8	124.8	2995.2	124.8	11.0	4.6	1.2	3.5	150	10.5" Card

Mobile version of the Quadro (Kxxx) series.

Model	Launch	Code name	Fab (nm)	Bus interface	Core clock (MHz)	Shader clock (MHz)	Memory clock (MHz)	Core config^{1}	Cache		Memory				Fillrate		Processing power (GFLOPS)	Supported API version		Nvidia Optimus technology	TDP (Watts)	Notes
Model	Launch	Code name	Fab (nm)	Bus interface	Core clock (MHz)	Shader clock (MHz)	Memory clock (MHz)	Core config^{1}	L1/SM (KiB)	L2 (MiB)	Size (GiB)	Bandwidth (GB/s)	Bus type	Bus width (bit)	Pixel (GP/s)	Texture (GT/s)	Single precision	Direct3D	OpenGL	Nvidia Optimus technology	TDP (Watts)	Notes
Quadro K500M	Jun 1, 2012	GK107	28	PCIe 3.0 x16	850	850	1600	192:16:8	16	0.125	1	12.8	DDR3	64	6.8	13.6	326.4	11.0	4.5	Yes	35	
Quadro K1000M	Jun 1, 2012	GK107	28	PCIe 3.0 x16	850	850	1800	192:16:16	16	0.25	2	28.8	DDR3	128	13.6	13.6	326.4	11.0	4.5	Yes	45	Dell Precision M4700
Quadro K2000M	Jun 1, 2012	GK107	28	PCIe 3.0 x16	745	745	1800	384:32:16	16	0.25	2	28.8	DDR3	128	11.92	23.84	572.16	11.0	4.5	Yes	55	Dell Precision M4700
Quadro K3000M	Jun 1, 2012	GK104	28	PCIe 3.0 x16	654	654	2800	576:48:32	16	0.5	2	89.6	GDDR5	256	20.93	31.39	753.41	11.0	4.5	Yes	75	Dell Precision M6700
Quadro K4000M	Jun 1, 2012	GK104	28	PCIe 3.0 x16	600	600	2800	960:80:32	16	0.5	4	89.6	GDDR5	256	19.2	48	1152	11.0	4.5	Yes	100	Dell Precision M6700
Quadro K5000M	Aug 7, 2012	GK104	28	PCIe 3.0 x16	706	706	3000	1344:112:32	16	0.5	4	96	GDDR5	256	22.59	79.07	1897.73	11.0	4.5	Yes	100	Dell Precision M6700

Model	Launch	Code name	Fab (nm)	Bus interface	Core clock (MHz)	Shader clock (MHz)	Memory clock (MHz)	Core config^{1}	Cache		Memory				Fillrate		Processing power (GFLOPS)	Supported API version		Nvidia Optimus technology	TDP (Watts)	Notes
Model	Launch	Code name	Fab (nm)	Bus interface	Core clock (MHz)	Shader clock (MHz)	Memory clock (MHz)	Core config^{1}	L1/SM (KiB)	L2 (MiB)	Size (GiB)	Bandwidth (GB/s)	Bus type	Bus width (bit)	Pixel (GP/s)	Texture (GT/s)	Single precision	Direct3D	OpenGL	Nvidia Optimus technology	TDP (Watts)	Notes
Quadro K510M	Jul 23, 2013	GK208	28	PCIe 3.0 x8	850	850	1200 (2400)	192:16:8 (1 SMX)	16	0.5	1	19.2	GDDR5	64	6.8	13.6	326.4	11.0	4.5	Yes	30	
Quadro K610M	Jul 23, 2013	GK208	28	PCIe 3.0 x16	980	980	1300 (2600)	192:16:8 (1 SMX)	16	0.5	1	20.8	GDDR5	64	7.84	15.68	376.32	11.0	4.5	Yes	30	
Quadro K1100M	Jul 23, 2013	GK107	28	PCIe 3.0 x16	716	716	1400 (2800)	384:32:16 (2 SMX)	16	0.25	2	44.8	GDDR5	128	11.45	22.91	549.89	11.0	4.5	Yes	45	Dell Precision M3800 and M4800
Quadro K2100M	Jul 23, 2013	GK106	28	PCIe 3.0 x16	654	654	1500 (3000)	576:48:16 (3 SMX)	16	0.25	2	48.0	GDDR5	128	10.46	31.39	753.41	11.0	4.5	Yes	55	Dell Precision M4800
Quadro K3100M	Jul 23, 2013	GK104	28	PCIe 3.0 x16	680	680	800 (3200)	768:64:32 (4 SMX)	16	0.5	4	102.4	GDDR5	256	21.76	43.52	1044.48	11.0	4.5	Yes	75	Dell Precision M6800
Quadro K4100M	Jul 23, 2013	GK104	28	PCIe 3.0 x16	706	706	800 (3200)	1152:96:32 (6 SMX)	16	0.5	4	102.4	GDDR5	256	22.59	67.77	1626.624	11.0	4.5	Yes	100	Dell Precision M6800
Quadro K5100M	Jul 23, 2013	GK104	28	PCIe 3.0 x16	771	771	900 (3600)	1536:128:32 (8 SMX)	16	0.5	8	115.2	GDDR5	256	24.67	98.68	2368.51	11.0	4.5	Yes	100	Dell Precision M6800

Model	Launch	Code name	Fab (nm)	Bus interface	Core clock (MHz)	Boost clock (MHz)	Memory clock (MHz)	Core config^{1}	Cache		Memory				Fillrate		Processing power (GFLOPS)		Supported API version					Nvidia Optimus technology	TDP (Watts)
Model	Launch	Code name	Fab (nm)	Bus interface	Core clock (MHz)	Boost clock (MHz)	Memory clock (MHz)	Core config^{1}	L1/SM (KiB)	L2 (MiB)	Size (GiB)	Bandwidth (GB/s)	Bus type	Bus width (bit)	Pixel (GP/s)	Texture (GT/s)	Single precision	Double precision	Direct3D	OpenGL	Vulkan	OpenCL	CUDA	Nvidia Optimus technology	TDP (Watts)
Quadro K2200M	Jul 19, 2014	GM107	28	PCIe 3.0 x16	1150	1150	1253 (5012)	640:40:16 (5 SMM)	64	2	2	80.2	GDDR5	128	18.4	46	1472	46	12.1	4.6	1.3	3.0	5.0	Yes	65

=== Quadro Mxxx series ===
- ^{1}Unified shaders: texture mapping units: render output units: streaming multiprocessors

Model	Launch	Code name	Fab (nm)	Bus interface	Core clock (MHz)	Shader clock (MHz)	Memory clock (MHz)	Core config^{1}	Cache		Memory				Fillrate		Processing power (GFLOPS)		Supported API version					TDP (Watts)	Release price (USD)	Notes
Model	Launch	Code name	Fab (nm)	Bus interface	Core clock (MHz)	Shader clock (MHz)	Memory clock (MHz)	Core config^{1}	L1/SM (KiB)	L2 (MiB)	Size (GiB)	Bandwidth (GB/s)	Bus type	Bus width (bit)	Pixel (GP/s)	Texture (GT/s)	Single precision	Double precision	Direct3D	OpenGL	Vulkan	OpenCL	CUDA	TDP (Watts)	Release price (USD)	Notes
Quadro M2000	Apr 8, 2016	GM206-875-A1	28	PCIe 3.0 x16	796	1163	1653 (6612)	768:48:32:6	48	1	4	105.8	GDDR5	128	37.8	56.6	1812.5	56.6	12.1	4.6	1.3	1.2	5.2	75	$438	Four DisplayPort 1.2a
Quadro M4000	Jun 29, 2015	GM204-850-A1	28	PCIe 3.0 x16	773	773	1503 (6012)	1664:104:64:13	48	2	8	192.4	GDDR5	256	51.2	83.2	2662.4	83.2	12.1	4.6	1.3	1.2	5.2	120	$791	Four DisplayPort 1.2a
Quadro M5000	Jun 29, 2015	GM204-875-A1	28	PCIe 3.0 x16	861	1038	1653 (6612)	2048:128:64:16	48	2	8	211.6	GDDR5	256	67.2	134.4	4300.8	134.4	12.1	4.6	1.3	1.2	5.2	150	$2857	Four DisplayPort 1.2a, One DVI-I
Quadro M6000	Mar 21, 2015	GM200GL; GM200-880-A1	28	PCIe 3.0 x16	988	1114	1653 (6612)	3072:192:96:24	48	3	12; 24	317	GDDR5	384	106.9	213.9 285.2	6070	190	12.1	4.6	1.3	1.2	5.2	250	$4200 $4999	Four DisplayPort 1.2a, One DVI-I

Mobile version of the Quadro (Mxxxx) series.

- ^{1}Unified shaders: texture mapping units: render output units

Model	Launch	Code name	Fab (nm)	Bus interface	Core clock (MHz)	Boost clock (MHz)	Memory clock (MHz)	Core config^{1}	Memory				Fillrate		Processing power (GFLOPS)		Supported API version					Nvidia Optimus technology	TDP (Watts)
Model	Launch	Code name	Fab (nm)	Bus interface	Core clock (MHz)	Boost clock (MHz)	Memory clock (MHz)	Core config^{1}	Size (GiB)	Bandwidth (GB/s)	Bus type	Bus width (bit)	Pixel (GP/s)	Texture (GT/s)	Single precision	Double precision	Direct3D	OpenGL	Vulkan	OpenCL	CUDA	Nvidia Optimus technology	TDP (Watts)
Quadro M500M	Apr 27, 2016	GM108	28	PCIe 3.0 x16	1029	1124	900 (1800)	384:24:8 (3 SMM)	2	14.40	DDR3	64	8.992	17.98	863.2	26.98	12.1	4.6	1.3	3.0	5.0	Yes	25
Quadro M600M	Aug 18, 2015	GM107	28	PCIe 3.0 x16	837	876	1253 (5012)	384:24:16 (3 SMM)	2	80.2	GDDR5	128	7.008	14.02	672.8	21.02	12.1	4.6	1.3	3.0	5.0	Yes	30
Quadro M1000M	Aug 18, 2015	GM107	28	PCIe 3.0 x16	993		1253 (5012)	512:32:16 (4 SMM)	2	80.2	GDDR5	128	15.89	31.78	1017	31.78	12.1	4.6	1.3	3.0	5.0	Yes	40
Quadro M2000M	Dec 3, 2015	GM107	28	PCIe 3.0 x16	1029	1098	1253 (5012)	640:40:16 (5 SMM)	4	80.2	GDDR5	128	17.57	43.92	1405	43.92	12.1	4.6	1.3	3.0	5.0	Yes	55
Quadro M3000M	Aug 18, 2015	GM204	28	PCIe 3.0 x16	1050		1253 (5012)	1024:64:32 (8 SMM)	4	160.4	GDDR5	256	33.60	67.20	2150	67.20	12.1	4.6	1.3	3.0	5.2	Yes	75
Quadro M4000M	Aug 18, 2015	GM204	28	PCIe 3.0 x16	975		1253 (5012)	1280:80:48 (10 SMM)	4	160.4	GDDR5	256	62.40	78.00	2496	78.00	12.1	4.6	1.3	3.0	5.2	Yes	100
Quadro M5000M	Aug 18, 2015	GM204	28	PCIe 3.0 x16	962		1253 (5012)	1536:96:64 (12 SMM)	8	160.4	GDDR5	256	62.40	93.60	2955.3	93.60	12.1	4.6	1.3	3.0	5.2	Yes	100

Model	Launch	Code name	Fab (nm)	Bus interface	Core clock (MHz)	Boost clock (MHz)	Memory clock (MHz)	Core config^{1}	L2 Cache (MiB)	Memory				Fillrate		Processing power (GFLOPS)	Supported API version			Nvidia Optimus technology	TDP (Watts)
Model	Launch	Code name	Fab (nm)	Bus interface	Core clock (MHz)	Boost clock (MHz)	Memory clock (MHz)	Core config^{1}	L2 Cache (MiB)	Size (GiB)	Bandwidth (GB/s)	Bus type	Bus width (bit)	Pixel (GP/s)	Texture (GT/s)	Single precision	Direct3D	OpenGL	CUDA	Nvidia Optimus technology	TDP (Watts)
Quadro M520 Mobile	Jan 11, 2017	GM108	28	PCIe 3.0 x16	965	1176	5000	384:24:8 (3 SMM)	1	1	40	GDDR5	64	9.4	18.8	840	12.1	4.5	5.0	Yes	25
Quadro M620 Mobile	Jan 11, 2017	GM107	28	PCIe 3.0 x16	756	1018	5012	512:32:16 (4 SMM)	2	2	80.2	GDDR5	128	16.3	32.6	1000	12.1	4.5	5.0	Yes	30
Quadro M1200 Mobile	Jan 11, 2017	GM107	28	PCIe 3.0 x16	991	1148	5012	640:40:16 (5 SMM)	2	4	80.2	GDDR5	128	18.4	45.9	1400	12.1	4.5	5.0	Yes	45
Quadro M2200 Mobile	Jan 11, 2017	GM206	28	PCIe 3.0 x16	695	1037	5508	1024:64:32 (8 SMM)	1	4	88.1	GDDR5	128	33.2	66.3	2100	12.1	4.5	5.2	Yes	55

Model	Launch	Code name	Fab (nm)	Bus interface	Core clock (MHz)	Boost clock (MHz)	Memory clock (MHz)	Core config^{1}	L2 Cache (MiB)	Memory				Fillrate		Processing power (GFLOPS)	Supported API version			Nvidia Optimus technology	TDP (Watts)
Model	Launch	Code name	Fab (nm)	Bus interface	Core clock (MHz)	Boost clock (MHz)	Memory clock (MHz)	Core config^{1}	L2 Cache (MiB)	Size (GiB)	Bandwidth (GB/s)	Bus type	Bus width (bit)	Pixel (GP/s)	Texture (GT/s)	Single precision	Direct3D	OpenGL	CUDA	Nvidia Optimus technology	TDP (Watts)
Quadro M5500 Mobile	Apr 8, 2016	GM204	28	PCIe 3.0 x16	861	1140	6606	2048:128:64 (16 SMM)	2	8	211.4	GDDR5	256	73	145.9	4669	12.1	4.5	5.2	Yes	150

=== Quadro Pxxx series ===
- ^{1}Unified shaders: texture mapping units: render output units: streaming multiprocessors

Model	Launch	Code name	Fab (nm)	Bus interface	Core clock (MHz)	Boost clock (MHz)	Memory clock (MHz)	Core config^{1}	Cache		Memory				Fillrate		Processing power (GFLOPS)		Supported API version					TDP (Watts)	Release price (USD)	Notes
Model	Launch	Code name	Fab (nm)	Bus interface	Core clock (MHz)	Boost clock (MHz)	Memory clock (MHz)	Core config^{1}	L1/SM (KiB)	L2 (MiB)	Size (GiB)	Bandwidth (GB/s)	Bus type	Bus width (bit)	Pixel (GP/s)	Texture (GT/s)	Single precision	Double precision	Direct3D	OpenGL	Vulkan	OpenCL	CUDA	TDP (Watts)	Release price (USD)	Notes
Quadro P400	Feb 7, 2017	GP107-825	14	PCIe 3.0 x16	1228	1252	1003 (4012)	256:16:16:2	48	0.5	2	32	GDDR5	64	17.1	17.1	641	20.0	12.1	4.6	1.3	1.2	6.1	30	$120	Three Mini-DisplayPort 1.4
Quadro P600	Feb 7, 2017	GP107-850	14	PCIe 3.0 x16	1329	1557	1003 (4012)	384:24:16:3	48	1	2	64	GDDR5	128	21.7	32.5	1195	37.3	12.1	4.6	1.3	1.2	6.1	40	$178	Four Mini-DisplayPort 1.4
Quadro P620	Feb 1, 2018	GP107-855	14	PCIe 3.0 x16	1266	1354	1003 (4012)	512:32:16:4	48	1	2	64	GDDR5	128	23.3	46.6	1490	46.6	12.1	4.6	1.3	1.2	6.1	40		Four Mini-DisplayPort 1.4
Quadro P1000	Feb 7, 2017	GP107-860	14	PCIe 3.0 x16	1266	1481	1253 (5012)	640:40:32:5	48	1	4	80.2	GDDR5	128	43.3	54.2	1894	59.2	12.1	4.6	1.3	1.2	6.1	47	$375	Four Mini-DisplayPort 1.4
Quadro P2000	Feb 6, 2017	GP106-875	16	PCIe 3.0 x16	1076	1480	2002 (8008)	1024:64:40:8	48	1.25	5	140	GDDR5	160	54.8	87.7	3010	93.8	12.1	4.6	1.3	1.2	6.1	75	$585	Four DisplayPort 1.4
Quadro P2200	Jun 10, 2019	GP106-880-K1-A1	16	PCIe 3.0 x16	1000	1493	1251 (10008)	1280:80:40:9	48	1.25	5	200	GDDR5X	160	59.7	119.4	3822	121.3	12.1	4.6	1.3	1.2	6.1	75		Four DisplayPort 1.4
Quadro P4000	Feb 6, 2017	GP104-850-A1	16	PCIe 3.0 x16	1202	1480	1901 (7604)	1792:112:64:14	48	2	8	243	GDDR5	256	78.5	137.4	5300	165.6	12.1	4.6	1.3	1.2	6.1	105	$815	Four DisplayPort 1.4
Quadro P5000	Oct 1, 2016	GP104-875-A1	16	PCIe 3.0 x16	1607	1733	1126 (9008)	2560:160:64:20	48	2	16	288	GDDR5X	256	102.8	257.1	8873	277.3	12.1	4.6	1.3	1.2	6.1	180	$2499	Four DisplayPort 1.4, One DVI-D
Quadro P6000	Oct 1, 2016	GP102-875-A1	16	PCIe 3.0 x16	1506	1645	1126 (9008)	3840:240:96:30	48	3	24	432	GDDR5X	384	136.0	340.0	10882 (11758)	~340	12.1	4.6	1.3	1.2	6.1	250	$5999	Four DisplayPort 1.4, One DVI-D
Quadro GP100	Oct 1, 2016	GP100-876-A1	16	PCIe 3.0 x16	1304	1442	703 (1406)	3584:224:128:56	24	4	16	720	HBM2	4096	184.7	323	10336	5168	12.1	4.6	1.3	1.2	6.0	235		NVLINK support

Mobile version of the Quadro (Px000) series series.

Model	Launch	Code name	Fab (nm)	Bus interface	Core clock (MHz)	Boost clock (MHz)	Memory clock (MHz)	Core config^{1}	Cache		Memory				Fillrate		Processing power (GFLOPS)	Supported API version			Nvidia Optimus technology	TDP (Watts)
Model	Launch	Code name	Fab (nm)	Bus interface	Core clock (MHz)	Boost clock (MHz)	Memory clock (MHz)	Core config^{1}	L1/SM (KiB)	L2 (MiB)	Size (GiB)	Bandwidth (GB/s)	Bus type	Bus width (bit)	Pixel (GP/s)	Texture (GT/s)	Single precision	Direct3D	OpenGL	CUDA	Nvidia Optimus technology	TDP (Watts)
Quadro P500 Mobile	Jan 5, 2018	GP108	14	PCIe 3.0 x16	1455	1519	1253	256:16:16:2	48	0.5	2	40	GDDR5	64	24.3	24.3	750	12.1	4.5	6.1	Yes	18
Quadro P600 Mobile	Feb 7, 2017	GP107	14	PCIe 3.0 x16	1430	1620	1252	384:24:16:3	48	1	2	80	GDDR5	128	25.92	38.88	1200	12.1	4.5	6.1	Yes	25
Quadro P1000 Mobile	Feb 7, 2017	GP107(N18P-Q1-A1)	14	PCIe 3.0 x16	1493	1519	1502	512:32:16:4	48	1	4	96	GDDR5	128	24.3	48.61	1600	12.1	4.5	6.1	Yes	40
Quadro P2000 Mobile	Feb 6, 2017	GP107(N18P-Q3-A1)	14	PCIe 3.0 x16	1557	1607	1502	768:64:32:6	48	1	4	96	GDDR5	128	51.42	77.14	2400	12.1	4.5	6.1	Yes	50
Quadro P3000 Mobile	Jan 11, 2017	GP106	16	PCIe 3.0 x16	1088	1215	1752	1280:80:48:10	48	1.5	6	168	GDDR5	192	58.32	97.2	3098	12.1	4.5	6.1	Yes	75
Quadro P4000 Mobile	Jan 11, 2017	GP104	16	PCIe 3.0 x16	1202	1228	1500	1792:112:64:14	48	2	8	192	GDDR5	256	78.59	137.5	4398	12.1	4.5	6.1	Yes	100
Quadro P4000 Max-Q	Jan 11, 2017	GP104	16	PCIe 3.0 x16	1114	1228	1502	1792:112:64:14	48	2	8	192	GDDR5	256	78.59	137.5		12.1	4.5	6.1	Yes	80
Quadro P5000 Mobile	Jan 11, 2017	GP104	16	PCIe 3.0 x16	1164	1506	1500	2048:128:64:16	48	2	16	192	GDDR5	256	96.38	192.8	6197	12.1	4.5	6.1	Yes	100

Model	Launch	Code name	Fab (nm)	Bus interface	Core clock (MHz)	Boost clock (MHz)	Memory clock (MHz)	Core config^{1}	Cache		Memory				Fillrate		Processing power (GFLOPS)	Supported API version			Nvidia Optimus technology	TDP (Watts)
Model	Launch	Code name	Fab (nm)	Bus interface	Core clock (MHz)	Boost clock (MHz)	Memory clock (MHz)	Core config^{1}	L1/SM (KiB)	L2 (MiB)	Size (GiB)	Bandwidth (GB/s)	Bus type	Bus width (bit)	Pixel (GP/s)	Texture (GT/s)	Single precision	Direct3D	OpenGL	CUDA	Nvidia Optimus technology	TDP (Watts)
Quadro P3200 Mobile	Feb 21, 2018	GP104	16	PCIe 3.0 x16	1328	1543	1752	1792:112:64:14	48	1.5	6	168.2	GDDR5	192	98.75	172.8	5530	12.1	4.5	6.1	Yes	75
Quadro P4200 Mobile	Feb 21, 2018	GP104	16	PCIe 3.0 x16	1418	1594	1753	2304:144:64:18	48	2	8	224.4	GDDR5	256	102.0	229.5	7345	12.1	4.5	6.1	Yes	100
Quadro P4200 Max-Q	Feb 21, 2018	GP104	16	PCIe 3.0 x16	1215	1480	1753	2304:144:64:18	48	2	8	224.4	GDDR5	256	94.72	213.1	6820	12.1	4.5	6.1	Yes	100
Quadro P5200 Mobile	Feb 21, 2018	GP104	16	PCIe 3.0 x16	1582	1759	1804	2560:160:64:20	48	2	16	230.9	GDDR5	256	112.6	281.4	9006	12.1	4.5	6.1	Yes	100
Quadro P5200 Max-Q	Feb 21, 2018	GP104	16	PCIe 3.0 x16	1240	1480	1804	2560:160:64:20	48	2	16	230.9	GDDR5	256	94.72	236.8	7578	12.1	4.5	6.1	Yes	100

=== Quadro GVxxx series ===
- ^{1} Unified shaders: texture mapping units: render output units: streaming multiprocessors: tensor cores

Model	Launch	Code name	Fab (nm)	Bus interface	Core clock (MHz)	Boost clock (MHz)	Memory clock (MHz)	Core config^{1}	Cache		Memory				Fillrate		Processing power (TFLOPS)		Supported API version					TDP (Watts)	Notes
Model	Launch	Code name	Fab (nm)	Bus interface	Core clock (MHz)	Boost clock (MHz)	Memory clock (MHz)	Core config^{1}	L1/SM (KiB)	L2 (MiB)	Size (GiB)	Bandwidth (GB/s)	Bus type	Bus width (bit)	Pixel (GP/s)	Texture (GT/s)	Single precision	Double precision	Direct3D	OpenGL	Vulkan	OpenCL	CUDA	TDP (Watts)	Notes
Quadro GV100	Mar 27, 2018	GV100-875-A1	12	PCIe 3.0 x16	1132	1627	848 (1696)	5120:320:128:80:640	128	6	32	870	HBM2	4096	208.4	521	14.8	7.4	12.1	4.6	1.3	3.0	7.0	250	4× DisplayPort, NVLINK support

=== Quadro RTX x000 / Tx00 / Tx000 series ===
- ^{1} Unified shaders: texture mapping units: render output units: streaming multiprocessors: tensor cores

Model	Launch	Code name	Fab (nm)	Bus interface	Core clock (MHz)	Boost clock (MHz)	Memory clock (MHz)	Core config^{1}	Cache		Memory				Fillrate		Processing power (TFLOPS)		Supported API version					TDP (Watts)	Release price (USD)	Notes
Model	Launch	Code name	Fab (nm)	Bus interface	Core clock (MHz)	Boost clock (MHz)	Memory clock (MHz)	Core config^{1}	L1/SM (KiB)	L2 (MiB)	Size (GiB)	Bandwidth (GB/s)	Bus type	Bus width (bit)	Pixel (GP/s)	Texture (GT/s)	Single precision	Double precision	Direct3D	OpenGL	Vulkan	OpenCL	CUDA	TDP (Watts)	Release price (USD)	Notes
Quadro RTX 4000	Nov 13, 2018	TU104-850-A1	12	PCIe 3.0 x16	1005	1545	1625 (13000)	2304:144:64:36:288	64	4	8	416	GDDR6	256	98.9	222.5	7.119	0.2225	12.2	4.6	1.3	3.0	7.5	100-125	$899	3× DisplayPort 1× USB Type-C
Quadro RTX 5000	Aug 13, 2018	TU104-875-A1	12	PCIe 3.0 x16	1620	1815	1750 (14000)	3072:192:64:48:384	64	4	16	448	GDDR6	256	116.2	348.5	11.15	0.3485	12.2	4.6	1.3	3.0	7.5	125-230	$2299	3× DisplayPort 1× USB Type-C
Quadro RTX 6000	Aug 13, 2018	TU102-875-A1	12	PCIe 3.0 x16	1440	1770	1750 (14000)	4608:288:96:72:576	64	6	24	672	GDDR6	384	169.9	509.8	16.31	0.5098	12.2	4.6	1.3	3.0	7.5	100-260	$6299	3× DisplayPort 1× USB Type-C
Quadro RTX 8000	Aug 13, 2018	TU102-875-A1	12	PCIe 3.0 x16	1395	1770	1750 (14000)	4608:288:96:72:576	64	6	48	672	GDDR6	384	169.9	509.8	16.31	0.5098	12.2	4.6	1.3	3.0	7.5	100-260	$9999	3× DisplayPort 1× USB Type-C

- ^{1} Unified shaders: texture mapping units: render output units: streaming multiprocessors

Model	Launch	Code name	Fab (nm)	Bus interface	Core clock (MHz)	Boost clock (MHz)	Memory clock (MT)	Core config^{1}	Cache		Memory				Fillrate		Processing power (TFLOPS)		Supported API version					TDP (Watts)	Notes
Model	Launch	Code name	Fab (nm)	Bus interface	Core clock (MHz)	Boost clock (MHz)	Memory clock (MT)	Core config^{1}	L1/SM (KiB)	L2 (MiB)	Size (GiB)	Bandwidth (GB/s)	Bus type	Bus width (bit)	Pixel (GP/s)	Texture (GT/s)	Single precision	Double precision	Direct3D	OpenGL	Vulkan	OpenCL	CUDA	TDP (Watts)	Notes
NVIDIA T400	May 6, 2021	TU117	TSMC; 12FFN	PCIe 3.0 x16	420	1425	10000	384:24:16:6	64	1	2; 4	80	GDDR6	64	22.8	34.2	1.09	0.0341	12.1	4.6	1.3	3.0	7.5	30	3× Mini-DisplayPort
NVIDIA T600	Apr 12, 2021	TU117-850-A1	TSMC; 12FFN	PCIe 3.0 x16	735	1335	10000	640:40:32:10	64	1	4	160	GDDR6	128	42.7	53.4	1.7	0.0531	12.1	4.6	1.3	3.0	7.5	40	4× Mini-DisplayPort
NVIDIA T1000	May 6, 2021	TU117	TSMC; 12FFN	PCIe 3.0 x16	1065	1395	10000	896:56:32:14	64	1	4; 8	160	GDDR6	128	44.6	78.1	2.5	0.0781	12.1	4.6	1.3	3.0	7.5	50	4× Mini-DisplayPort

Mobile version of the Quadro RTX / T x000 series.

- ^{1} Unified shaders: texture mapping units: render output units: streaming multiprocessors: tensor cores (or FP16 Cores in T x000 Series)

Model name	Launch	Code name	Fab (nm)	Bus interface	Core clock (MHz)	Boost clock (MHz)	Core config ^{1}	L2 Cache (MiB)	Memory					Fillrate		Processing power (TFLOPS)			Supported API version					TDP (Watts)	Notes
Model name	Launch	Code name	Fab (nm)	Bus interface	Core clock (MHz)	Boost clock (MHz)	Core config ^{1}	L2 Cache (MiB)	Size (GiB)	Bandwidth (GB/s)	Memory clock (MHz)	Bus type	Bus width (bit)	Pixel (GP/s)	Texture (GT/s)	Half precision	Single precision	Double precision	Direct3D	OpenGL	Vulkan	OpenCL	CUDA	TDP (Watts)	Notes
Quadro T500 Mobile	Dec 2, 2020	TU117 (N19P-Q1-A1)	12	PCIe 3.0	1365	1695	896:56 :32:14:56	1	2	80	1250	GDDR5	64	54.24	94.92	5.591	2.796	0.087	12.1	4.6	1.2	3.0	7.5	25	
Quadro T500 Mobile	Dec 2, 2020	TU117 (N19P-Q1-A1)	12	PCIe 3.0	1365	1695	896:56 :32:14:56	1	4	80	1250	GDDR5	64	49.92	87.36	6.075	3.037	0.095	12.1	4.6	1.2	3.0	7.5	18	
Quadro T550 Mobile	May 2022	TU117	12	PCIe 3.0	1065	1665	1024:64 :32:26:64	1	4	112	1500	GDDR5	64	53.28	106.6	6.82	3.41	0.107	12.1	4.6	1.2	3.0	7.5	23	
Quadro T600 Mobile	Apr 12, 2021	TU117	12	PCIe 3.0	780	1410	896:56 :32:14:56	1	4	192	1500	GDDR5	128	45.12	78.96	5.053	2.527	0.079	12.1	4.6	1.2	3.0	7.5	40	
Quadro T1000 Mobile	May 27, 2019	TU117 (N19P-Q1-A1)	12	PCIe 3.0	1395	1455	768:48 :32:12:1536	1	4	128	2000	GDDR5	128	46.56	69.84	5.215	2.607	0.082	12.1	4.6	1.2	3.0	7.5	40-50	
Quadro T1200 Mobile	Apr 12, 2021	TU117	12	PCIe 3.0	1515	1785	1024:64 :32:16:64	1	4	224	1500	GDDR5	128	57.12	114.2	7.311	3.656	0.1142	12.1	4.6	1.2	3.0	7.5	18	
Quadro T2000 Mobile	May 27, 2019	TU117 (N19P-Q3-A1)	12	PCIe 3.0	1575	1785	1024:64 :32:16:2048	1	4	128	2001	GDDR5	128	57.1	114.2	7.311	3.656	0.114	12.1	4.6	1.2	3.0	7.5	60	
Quadro T2000 Max-Q	May 27, 2019	TU117	12	PCIe 3.0	1035	1395	1024:64 :32:16:2048	1	4	128	1250	GDDR5	128	44.64	89.28	5.714	2.857	0.089	12.1	4.6	1.2	3.0	7.5	40	
Quadro RTX 3000 Mobile	May 27, 2019	TU106 (N19E-Q1-KA-K1)	12	PCIe 3.0	945	1380	2304:144 :48:36:288	4	6	448	1750	GDDR6	256	88.32	198.7	12.72	6.359	0.1987	12.1	4.6	1.2	3.0	7.5	60-80	
Quadro RTX 3000 Max-Q	May 27, 2019	TU106	12	PCIe 3.0	600	1215	2304:144 :48:36:288	4	6	416	1625	GDDR6	256	77.76	175.0	11.2	5.6	0.175	12.1	4.6	1.2	3.0	7.5	60	
Quadro RTX 4000 Mobile	May 27, 2019	TU104 (N19E-Q3-A1)	12	PCIe 3.0	1110	1560	2560:160 :64:40:320	4	8	448	1750	GDDR6	256	99.84	249.6	15.97	7.987	0.25	12.1	4.6	1.2	3.0	7.5	110	
Quadro RTX 4000 Max-Q	May 27, 2019	TU104	12	PCIe 3.0	780	1380	2560:160 :64:40:320	4	8	416	1625	GDDR6	256	88.32	220.8	14.13	7.066	0.221	12.1	4.6	1.2	3.0	7.5	80	
Quadro RTX 5000 Mobile	May 27, 2019	TU104 (N19E-Q5-A1)	12	PCIe 3.0	1035	1530	3072:192 :64:48:384	4	16	448	1750	GDDR6	256	98.88	296.6	18.98	9.492	0.297	12.1	4.6	1.2	3.0	7.5	110	
Quadro RTX 5000 Max-Q	May 27, 2019	TU104	12	PCIe 3.0	600	1350	3072:192 :64:48:384	4	16	384	1500	GDDR6	256	86.40	259.2	16.59	8.294	0.26	12.1	4.6	1.2	3.0	7.5	80	
Quadro RTX 6000 Mobile	Sep 4, 2019	TU102	12	PCIe 3.0	1275	1455	4608:288 :96:72:576	6	24	672	1750	GDDR6	384	139.7	419.0	26.82	13.41	0.42	12.1	4.6	1.2	3.0	7.5	200	

=== RTX Ax000 series ===
- ^{1} Unified shaders: texture mapping units: render output units: streaming multiprocessors: tensor cores

Model name	Launch	Code name	Fab (nm)	Bus interface	Core clock (MHz)	Boost clock (MHz)	Memory clock (MHz)	Core config^{1}	Cache		Memory				Fillrate			Processing power (TFLOPS)				Supported API version					TDP (Watts)	Release price (USD)	Notes
Model name	Launch	Code name	Fab (nm)	Bus interface	Core clock (MHz)	Boost clock (MHz)	Memory clock (MHz)	Core config^{1}	L1/SM (KiB)	L2 (MiB)	Size (GiB)	Bandwidth (GB/s)	Bus type	Bus width (bit)	Pixel (GP/s)	Texture (GT/s)	Ray tracing (TFLOPS)	Half precision	Single precision	Double precision	Tensor compute (FP16) (sparse)	Direct3D	OpenGL	Vulkan	OpenCL	CUDA	TDP (Watts)	Release price (USD)	Notes
RTX A400	Apr 16, 2024	GA107	8	PCIe 4.0 x8	727	1762	1500 (12000)	768:24 :16:6:24	128	2	4	96	GDDR6	64	28.19	42.29	5.4	2.706	2.706	0.04229	21.7	12.2	4.6	1.3	3.0	8.6	50	$135	4× mini DisplayPort
RTX A1000	Apr 16, 2024	GA107	8	PCIe 4.0 x8	727	1462	1500 (12000)	2304:72 :32:18:72	128	2	8	192	GDDR6	128	46.78	105.3	13.2	6.737	6.737	0.1053	53.8	12.2	4.6	1.3	3.0	8.6	50	$365	4× mini DisplayPort
RTX A2000	Aug 10, 2021	GA106-850-A1	8	PCIe 4.0 x16	562	1200	1500 (12000)	3328:104 :48:26:104	128	3	6	288	GDDR6	192	57.6	124.8	15.6	7.987	7.987	0.1248	63.9	12.2	4.6	1.3	3.0	8.6	70	$449	4× mini DisplayPort
RTX A2000	Aug 10, 2021	GA106-850-A1	8	PCIe 4.0 x16	562	1200	1500 (12000)	3328:104 :48:26:104	128	3	12	288	GDDR6	192	57.6	124.8	15.6	7.987	7.987	0.1248	63.9	12.2	4.6	1.3	3.0	8.6	70	$449	4× mini DisplayPort
RTX A4000	Apr 12, 2021	GA104-875-A1	8	PCIe 4.0 x16	735	1560	1750 (14000)	6144:192 :96:48:192	128	4	16	448	GDDR6	256	149.769	299.5	37.4	19.17	19.17	0.2995	153.4	12.2	4.6	1.3	3.0	8.6	140	$1000	4× DisplayPort
RTX A4500	Nov 23, 2021	GA102-825-KD-A1	8	PCIe 4.0 x16	1050	1650	2000 (16000)	7168:224 :80:56:224	128	6	20	640	GDDR6	320	132.008	369.623	46.2	23.66	23.66	0.3696	189.2	12.2	4.6	1.3	3.0	8.6	200		4× DisplayPort
RTX A5000	Apr 12, 2021	GA102-850-A1	8	PCIe 4.0 x16	1170	1695	2000 (16000)	8192:256 :96:64:256	128	6	24	768	GDDR6	384	162.730	433.947	54.2	27.77	27.77	0.4339	222.2	12.2	4.6	1.3	3.0	8.6	230	$2250	4× DisplayPort
RTX A5500	Mar 22, 2022	GA102-860-A1	8	PCIe 4.0 x16	1080	1665	2000 (16000)	10240:320 :112:80:320	128	6	24	768	GDDR6	384	186.491	532.834	66.6	34.10	34.10	0.5328	272.8	12.2	4.6	1.3	3.0	8.6	230	$3600	4× DisplayPort
RTX A6000	Oct 5, 2020	GA102-875-A1	8	PCIe 4.0 x16	1410	1800	2000 (16000)	10752:336 :112:84:336	128	6	48	768	GDDR6	384	201.612	604.838	75.6	38.71	38.71	0.6048	309.7	12.2	4.6	1.3	3.0	8.6	300	$4649	4× DisplayPort

Mobile version of the RTX Ax000 series.×

Model name	Launch	Code name	Fab (nm)	Bus interface	Core clock (MHz)	Boost clock (MHz)	Core config^{1}	L2 Cache (MiB)	Memory					Fillrate		Processing power (TFLOPS)			Supported API version					TDP (Watts)	Release price (USD)	Notes
Model name	Launch	Code name	Fab (nm)	Bus interface	Core clock (MHz)	Boost clock (MHz)	Core config^{1}	L2 Cache (MiB)	Size (GiB)	Bandwidth (GB/s)	Memory clock (MHz)	Bus type	Bus width (bit)	Pixel (GP/s)	Texture (GT/s)	Half precision	Single precision	Double precision	Direct3D	OpenGL	Vulkan	OpenCL	CUDA	TDP (Watts)	Release price (USD)	Notes
RTX A500 Mobile	Mar 22, 2022	GA107S	Samsung 8N	PCIe 4.0	832	1537	2048:64 :32:16:64	2	4	112	1500	GDDR6	64	49.18	98.37	6.296	6.296	0.09837	12.2	4.6	1.3	3.0	8.6	60		
RTX A1000 Mobile	Mar 30, 2022	GA107	Samsung 8N	PCIe 4.0	630	1140	2048:64 :32:16:64	2	4	224	1375	GDDR6	128	36.48	72.96	4.669	4.669	0.07296	12.2	4.6	1.3	3.0	8.6	60	$365	
RTX A1000 Mobile 6 GB	Mar 30, 2022	GA107	Samsung 8N	PCIe 4.0	652	1140	2560:80 :32:20:80	2	6	168	1375	GDDR6	96	36.48	91.20	5.837	5.837	0.0912	12.2	4.6	1.3	3.0	8.6	95		
RTX A2000 Mobile	Apr 12, 2021	GA106	Samsung 8N	PCIe 4.0	1215	1687	2560:80 :48:20:80	2	4	192	1500	GDDR6	128	80.98	135.0	8.637	8.637	0.135	12.2	4.6	1.3	3.0	8.6	95		
RTX A3000 Mobile	Apr 12, 2021	GA104-A1	Samsung 8N	PCIe 4.0	600	1230	4096:128 :64:32:128	4	6	264	1375	GDDR6	192	78.72	157.4	10.08	10.08	0.1574	12.2	4.6	1.3	3.0	8.6	70		
RTX A3000 Mobile 12 GB	Mar 22, 2022	GA104-A1	Samsung 8N	PCIe 4.0	855	1440	4096:128 :64:32:128	4	12	336	1750	GDDR6	192	92.16	184.3	11.8	11.8	0.1843	12.2	4.6	1.3	3.0	8.6	115		
RTX A4000 Mobile	Apr 12, 2021	GA104-A1	Samsung 8N	PCIe 4.0	1140	1680	5120:160 :80:40:160	4	8	384	1500	GDDR6	256	134.4	268.8	17.2	17.2	0.2688	12.2	4.6	1.3	3.0	8.6	140		
RTX A4500 Mobile	Mar 22, 2022	GA104-A1	Samsung 8N	PCIe 4.0	930	1500	5888:184 :96:46:184	4	16	512	2000	GDDR6	256	144.0	276.0	17.66	17.66	0.276	12.2	4.6	1.3	3.0	8.6	140		
RTX A5000 Mobile	Apr 12, 2021	GA104-A1	Samsung 8N	PCIe 4.0	900	1575	6144:192 :96:48:192	4	16	448	1750	GDDR6	256	151.2	302.4	19.35	19.35	0.3024	12.2	4.6	1.3	3.0	8.6	150		
RTX A5500 Mobile	Mar 22, 2022	GA103-A1	Samsung 8N	PCIe 4.0	975	1500	7424:232 :96:58:232	4	16	512	2000	GDDR6	256	159.85	386.30	22.27	22.27	0.384	12.2	4.6	1.3	3.0	8.6	165		

=== RTX Ada Generation ===
Model name	Launch	Code name	Fab (nm)	Bus interface	Core clock (MHz)	Boost clock (MHz)	Memory clock (MHz)	Core config^{1}	Cache		Memory				Fillrate			Processing power (TFLOPS)				Supported API version					TDP (Watts)	Size		Release price (USD)	Notes
Model name	Launch	Code name	Fab (nm)	Bus interface	Core clock (MHz)	Boost clock (MHz)	Memory clock (MHz)	Core config^{1}	L1/SM (KiB)	L2 (MiB)	Size (GiB)	Bandwidth (GB/s)	Bus type	Bus width (bit)	Pixel (GP/s)	Texture (GT/s)	Ray tracing (TFLOPS)	Half precision	Single precision	Double precision	Tensor compute (FP16) (sparse)	Direct3D	OpenGL	Vulkan	OpenCL	CUDA	TDP (Watts)	Profile	Slots	Release price (USD)	Notes
RTX 2000 Ada Generation	Feb 12, 2024	AD107-875-A1	TSMC 4N	PCIe 4.0 x8	1620	2130	2000	2816:88 :48:22:88	128	12	16	224	GDDR6	128	102.2	187.4	27.7	12.0	12.0	0.1874	96.0	12.2	4.6	1.3	3.0	8.9	70	HHHL	Double	$649	4× mini DisplayPort
RTX 4000 SFF Ada Generation	Mar 21, 2023	AD104	TSMC 4N	PCIe 4.0 x16	720	1560	1750 (14000)	6144:192 :80:48:192	128	48	20	280	GDDR6	160	125.2	300.5	44.3	19.23	19.23	0.3	153.4	12.2	4.6	1.3	3.0	8.9	70	HHHL	Double	$1250	4× mini DisplayPort
RTX 4000 Ada Generation	Aug 9, 2023	AD104	TSMC 4N	PCIe 4.0 x16	1500	2175	1750 (14000)	6144:192 :80:48:192	128	48	20	360	GDDR6	160	174	417.6	61.8	26.73	26.73	0.417	213.8	12.2	4.6	1.3	3.0	8.9	130	FHFL	Single	$1250	4× DisplayPort
RTX 4500 Ada Generation	Aug 9, 2023	AD103	TSMC 4N	PCIe 4.0 x16	2070	2580	2250 (18000)	7680:240 :80:60:240	128	48	24	432	GDDR6	192	206	620	91.6	39.63	39.63	0.619	318.9	12.2	4.6	1.3	3.0	8.9	210	FHFL	Double	$2250	4× DisplayPort
RTX 5000 Ada Generation	Aug 9, 2023	AD102-850- KAB-A1	TSMC 4N	PCIe 4.0 x16	1155	2550	2250 (18000)	12800:400 :160:100:400	128	72	32	576	GDDR6	256	408.0	1020	151.0	65.28	65.28	1.02	522.0	12.2	4.6	1.3	3.0	8.9	250	FHFL	Double	$4000	4× DisplayPort
RTX 5880 Ada Generation	Jan 5, 2024	AD102	TSMC 4N	PCIe 4.0 x16	975	2460	2500 (20000)	14080:440 :176:110:440	128	72	48	960	GDDR6	384	433.0	1082	160.2	69.27	69.27	1.082	554.0	12.2	4.6	1.3	3.0	8.9	285	FHFL	Double	$6999	4× DisplayPort
RTX 6000 Ada Generation	Dec 3, 2022	AD102-870-A1	TSMC 4N	PCIe 4.0 x16	915	2505	2500 (20000)	18176:568 :192:142:568	128	96	48	960	GDDR6	384	481.0	1423	210.6	91.06	91.06	1.423	728.5	12.2	4.6	1.3	3.0	8.9	300	FHFL	Double	$6799	4× DisplayPort

Mobile version of the RTX Ada Generation.

- ^{1} CUDA cores: RT cores: Tensor cores

Model name	Launch	Code name	Fab (nm)	Bus interface	Core clock (MHz)	Boost clock (MHz)	Core config^{1}	Cache		Memory					Fillrate		Processing power (TFLOPS)				Supported API version					TDP (Watts)	Notes
Model name	Launch	Code name	Fab (nm)	Bus interface	Core clock (MHz)	Boost clock (MHz)	Core config^{1}	L1/SM (KiB)	L2 (MiB)	Size (GiB)	Bandwidth (GB/s)	Memory clock (MHz)	Bus type	Bus width (bit)	Pixel (GP/s)	Texture (GT/s)	Half precision	Single precision	Double precision	Tensor	Direct3D	OpenGL	Vulkan	OpenCL	CUDA	TDP (Watts)	Notes
RTX 500 Mobile Ada Generation	Feb, 2024	AD107	TSMC 4N	PCIe 4.0	1485	2025	2048:16:64	128	12	4	128	2000	GDDR6	64	64.8	129.6	8.294	8.294	0.1296	73.7	12.2	4.6	1.3	3.0	8.9	35–60	
RTX 1000 Mobile Ada Generation	Feb, 2024	AD107	TSMC 4N	PCIe 4.0	1485	2025	2560:20:80	128	12	6	192	2000	GDDR6	96	97.2	162.0	10.37	10.37	0.162	96.5	12.2	4.6	1.3	3.0	8.9	35–140	
RTX 2000 Mobile Ada Generation	Mar, 2023	AD107	TSMC 4N	PCIe 4.0	1635	2115	3072:24:96	128	24	8	256	2000	GDDR6	128	101.5	203.0	12.99	12.99	0.203	115.8	12.2	4.6	1.3	3.0	8.9	35–140	
RTX 3000 Mobile Ada Generation	Mar, 2023	AD106	TSMC 4N	PCIe 4.0	1395	1695	4608:36:144	128	32	8 (ECC)	256	2000	GDDR6	128	81.36	244.1	15.62	15.62	0.2441	159.3	12.2	4.6	1.3	3.0	8.9	35–140	
RTX 3500 Mobile Ada Generation	Mar, 2023	AD104	TSMC 4N	PCIe 4.0	1110	1545	5120:40:160	128	48	12 (ECC)	432	2250	GDDR6	192	98.88	247.2	15.82	15.82	0.2472	184.3	12.2	4.6	1.3	3.0	8.9	60–140	
RTX 4000 Mobile Ada Generation	Mar, 2023	AD104	TSMC 4N	PCIe 4.0	1290	1665	7424:58:232	128	48	12 (ECC)	432	2250	GDDR6	192	133.2	386.3	24.72	24.72	0.3863	269.0	12.2	4.6	1.3	3.0	8.9	60–175	
RTX 5000 Mobile Ada Generation	Mar, 2023	AD103	TSMC 4N	PCIe 4.0	1425	2115	9728:76:304	128	64	16 (ECC)	576	2250	GDDR6	256	236.9	643.0	41.15	41.15	0.643	340.9	12.2	4.6	1.3	3.0	8.9	60–175	

=== RTX PRO Blackwell series ===
- ^{1} Unified shaders: texture mapping units: render output units: Tensor cores: RT cores

Model name	Launch	Code name	Fab (nm)	Bus interface	Core clock (MHz)	Boost clock (MHz)	Memory clock (MHz)	Core config^{1}	Cache		Memory				Fillrate			Processing power (TFLOPS)					Supported API version					TDP (Watts)	Size		Release price (USD)	Notes
Model name	Launch	Code name	Fab (nm)	Bus interface	Core clock (MHz)	Boost clock (MHz)	Memory clock (MHz)	Core config^{1}	L1/SM (KiB)	L2 (MiB)	Size (GiB)	Bandwidth (GB/s)	Bus type	Bus width (bit)	Pixel (GP/s)	Texture (GT/s)	Ray tracing (TFLOPS)	Half precision	Single precision	Double precision	Tensor (FP16) (sparse)	Tensor (FP4) (sparse)	Direct3D	OpenGL	Vulkan	OpenCL	CUDA	TDP (Watts)	Profile	Slots	Release price (USD)	Notes
RTX PRO 2000 Blackwell	Aug 11, 2025	GB206	TSMC 4N	PCIe 5.0 x8	982	1957	1125	4352:136 :48:136:34	128	32	16	288	GDDR7	128	93.94	266.2	52	17.03	17.03	0.2662		545	12.2	4.63	1.3	3.0	11.6	70	SSF	Double	$722	4× mini DisplayPort
RTX PRO 4000 Blackwell SFF Edition	Aug 11, 2025	GB203	TSMC 4N	PCIe 5.0 x8		1342	1125	8960:280 :96:280:70	128	48	24	432	GDDR7	192	128.8	375.8		24.05	24.05	0.3758			12.2	4.63	1.3	3.0	11.6	70	HHHL	Double		4× mini DisplayPort
RTX PRO 4000 Blackwell	Mar 18, 2025	GB203	TSMC 4N	PCIe 5.0 x16	1590	2617	1750	8960:280 :96:280:70	128	48	24	672	GDDR7	192	251.2	732.8	112	46.90	46.90	0.7328	280	1290	12.2	4.63	1.3	3.0	11.6	140	FHFL	Single	$1546	4× Display Port
RTX PRO 4500 Blackwell	Mar 18, 2025	GB203	TSMC 4N	PCIe 5.0 x16	1590	2617	1750	10496:328 :112:328:82	128	64	32	896	GDDR7	256	293.1	858.4	166.6	54.94	54.94	0.8584	328	1760	12.2	4.63	1.3	3.0	11.6	200	FHFL	Double	$2623	4× Display Port
RTX PRO 5000 Blackwell	Mar 18, 2025	GB202	TSMC 4N	PCIe 5.0 x16	1590	2617	1750	14080:440 :176:440:110	128	96	48 or 72	1344	GDDR7	384	460.6	1151	196	73.69	73.69	1.151	590	2064	12.2	4.63	1.3	3.0	11.6	300	FHFL	Double	$4569	4× Display Port
RTX PRO 6000 Blackwell Max-Q Workstation Edition	Mar 18, 2025	GB202	TSMC 4N	PCIe 5.0 x16	1590	2288	1750	24064:752 :192:752:188	128	128	96	1792	GDDR7	512	439.3	1721	330	110.1	110.1	1.721	881	3511	12.2	4.63	1.3	3.0	11.6	300	FHFL	Double	$8565	4× Display Port
RTX PRO 6000 Blackwell Workstation Edition	Mar 18, 2025	GB202	TSMC 4N	PCIe 5.0 x16	1590	2617	1750	24064:752 :192:752:188	128	128	96	1792	GDDR7	512	502.5	1968	380	126.0	126.0	1.968	1008	4030	12.2	4.63	1.3	3.0	11.6	600	FHFL	Double	$8565	4× Display Port

Mobile/laptop version of the RTX PRO Blackwell series

Model name	Launch	Code name	Fab (nm)	Bus interface	Core clock (MHz)	Boost clock (MHz)	Memory clock (MHz)	Core config^{1}	Cache		Memory				Fillrate			Processing power (TFLOPS)				Supported API version					TDP (Watts)	Release price (USD)
Model name	Launch	Code name	Fab (nm)	Bus interface	Core clock (MHz)	Boost clock (MHz)	Memory clock (MHz)	Core config^{1}	L1/SM (KiB)	L2 (MiB)	Size (GiB)	Bandwidth (GB/s)	Bus type	Bus width (bit)	Pixel (GP/s)	Texture (GT/s)	Ray tracing (TFLOPS)	Half precision	Single precision	Double precision	Tensor compute (FP16) (sparse)	Direct3D	OpenGL	Vulkan	OpenCL	CUDA	TDP (Watts)	Release price (USD)
RTX PRO 500 Blackwell Mobile	TBA	GB207	TSMC 4N	PCIe 5.0 x16	2235	2520	1750	1792:56 :24:56:14	128	24	6	336	GDDR7	96	60.48	141.1		9.032	9.032	0.1411	100	12.2	4.6	1.4	3.0	12.0	35	
RTX PRO 1000 Blackwell Mobile	TBA	GB207	TSMC 4N	PCIe 5.0 x16	2235	2520	1750	2560:80 :32:80:20	128	32	8	448	GDDR7	128	80.64	201.6		12.90	12.90	0.2016	200	12.2	4.6	1.4	3.0	12.0	35	
RTX PRO 2000 Blackwell Mobile	TBA	GB206	TSMC 4N	PCIe 5.0 x16	952	1455	1750	3328:104 :32:104:26	128	32	8	448	GDDR7	128	46.56	151.3		9.684	9.684	0.1513	240	12.2	4.6	1.4	3.0	12.0	45	
RTX PRO 3000 Blackwell Mobile	TBA	GB205	TSMC 4N	PCIe 5.0 x16	847	1447	1750	5888:184 :80:184:46	128	48	12	672	GDDR7	192	115.8	266.2		17.04	17.04	0.2662	430	12.2	4.6	1.4	3.0	12.0	60	
RTX PRO 4000 Blackwell Mobile	TBA	GB203	TSMC 4N	PCIe 5.0 x16	975	1500	1750	7680:240 :96:240:60	128	64	16	896	GDDR7	256	144.0	360.0		23.04	23.04	0.360	330	12.2	4.6	1.4	3.0	12.0	80	
RTX PRO 5000 Blackwell Mobile	TBA	GB203	TSMC 4N	PCIe 5.0 x16	990	1515	1750	10496:328 :112:328:82	128	64	24	896	GDDR7	256	169.7	496.9		31.80	31.80	0.4969	600	12.2	4.6	1.4	3.0	12.0	95	

== Data center GPUs ==
=== GRID ===
Model	Archi- tecture	Chips	Thread processors (total)	Bus interface	Memory		TDP (Watts)
Model	Archi- tecture	Chips	Thread processors (total)	Bus interface	Bus type	Size (GiB)	TDP (Watts)
GRID K1	Kepler	4× GK107	4× 192	PCIe 3.0 x16	DDR3	4× 4 GiB	130
GRID K2	Kepler	2× GK104-895	2× 1536	PCIe 3.0 x16	GDDR5	2× 4 GiB	225
GRID K340	Kepler	4× GK107	4× 384	PCIe 3.0 x16	GDDR5	4× 1 GiB	225
GRID K520	Kepler	2× GK104	2× 1536	PCIe 3.0 x16	GDDR5	2× 4 GiB	225

- Data from GRID GPUS

=== Tesla ===
Model	Microarchitecture	Launch	Core	Core clock (MHz)	Shaders			Memory					Processing power (TFLOPS) (Note: To calculate the processing power see Tesla (microarchitecture)#Performance, Fermi (microarchitecture)#Performance, Kepler (microarchitecture)#Performance, Maxwell (microarchitecture)#Performance, or Pascal (microarchitecture)#Performance. A number range specifies the minimum and maximum processing power at, respectively, the base clock and maximum boost clock.)			CUDA compute capability (Note: Core architecture version according to the CUDA programming guide.)	TDP (W)	Notes, form factor
Model	Microarchitecture	Launch	Core	Core clock (MHz)	Core config (Note: Main shader processors : texture mapping unit : render output units : tensor cores : ray-tracing cores (streaming multiprocessors))	Base clock (MHz)	Max boost clock (MHz) (Note: GPU Boost is a default feature that increases the core clock rate while remaining under the card's predetermined power budget. Multiple boost clocks are available, but this table lists the highest clock supported by each card.)	Bus type	Bus width (bit)	Size (GB)	Clock (MT/s)	Bandwidth (GB/s)	Half precision Tensor Core FP32 Accumulate	Single precision (MAD or FMA)	Double precision (FMA)	CUDA compute capability	TDP (W)	Notes, form factor
C870 GPU Computing Module (Note: Specifications not specified by Nvidia assumed to be based on the GeForce 8800 GTX)	Tesla	May 2, 2007	1× G80	600	128:32 :24:0:0 (16)	1350	—N/a	GDDR3	384	1.5	1600	76.8	No	0.3456	No	1.0	170.9	Internal PCIe GPU (full-height, dual-slot)
D870 Deskside Computer	Tesla	May 2, 2007	2× G80	600	2× 128:32 :24:0:0 (16)	1350	—N/a	GDDR3	2× 384	2× 1.5	1600	2× 76.8	No	0.6912	No	1.0	520	Deskside or 3U rack-mount external GPUs
S870 GPU Computing Server	Tesla	May 2, 2007	4× G80	600	4× 128:32 :24:0:0 (16)	1350	—N/a	GDDR3	4× 384	4× 1.5	1600	4× 76.8	No	1.382	No	1.0		1U rack-mount external GPUs, connect via 2× PCIe (×16)
C1060 GPU Computing Module (Note: Specifications not specified by Nvidia assumed to be based on the GeForce GTX 280)	Tesla	April 9, 2009	1× GT200	602	240:80 :32:0:0 (30)	1296	—N/a	GDDR3	512	4	1600	102.4	No	0.6221	0.07776	1.3	187.8	Internal PCIe GPU (full-height, dual-slot)
S1070 GPU Computing Server "400 configuration"	Tesla	June 1, 2008	4× GT200	602	4× 240:80 :32:0:0 (30)	1296	—N/a	GDDR3	4× 512	4× 4	1538.4	4× 98.5	No	2.488	0.311	1.3	800	1U rack-mount external GPUs, connect via 2× PCIe (×8 or ×16)
S1070 GPU Computing Server "500 configuration"	Tesla	June 1, 2008	4× GT200	602	4× 240:80 :32:0:0 (30)	1440	—N/a	GDDR3	4× 512	4× 4	1538.4	4× 98.5	No	2.765	0.3456	1.3	800	1U rack-mount external GPUs, connect via 2× PCIe (×8 or ×16)
S1075 GPU Computing Server	Tesla	June 1, 2008	4× GT200	602	4× 240:80 :32:0:0 (30)	1440	—N/a	GDDR3	4× 512	4× 4	1538	4× 98.5	No	2.765	0.3456	1.3		1U rack-mount external GPUs, connect via 1× PCIe (×8 or ×16)
Quadro Plex 2200 D2 Visual Computing System (Note: Specifications not specified by Nvidia assumed to be based on the Quadro FX 5800)	Tesla	July 25, 2008	2× GT200GL	648	2× 240:80 :32:0:0 (30)	1296	—N/a	GDDR3	2× 512	2× 4	1600	2× 102.4	No	1.244	0.1555	1.3		Deskside or 3U rack-mount external GPUs with 4 dual-link DVI outputs
Quadro Plex 2200 S4 Visual Computing System	Tesla	July 25, 2008	4× GT200GL	648	4× 240:80 :32:0:0 (30)	1296	—N/a	GDDR3	4× 512	4× 4	1600	4× 102.4	No	2.488	0.311	1.3	1200	1U rack-mount external GPUs, connect via 2× PCIe (×8 or ×16)
C2050 GPU Computing Module	Fermi	July 25, 2011	1× GF100	575	448:56 :48:0:0 (14)	1150	—N/a	GDDR5	384	3 (Note: With ECC on, a portion of the dedicated memory is used for ECC bits, so the available user memory is reduced by 12.5%. (e.g. 4 GB total memory yields 3.5 GB of user available memory.))	3000	144	No	1.030	0.5152	2.0	247	Internal PCIe GPU (full-height, dual-slot)
M2050 GPU Computing Module	Fermi	July 25, 2011	1× GF100	575	448:56 :48:0:0 (14)	1150	—N/a	GDDR5	384	3	3092	148.4	No	1.030	0.5152	2.0	225	Internal PCIe GPU (full-height, dual-slot)
C2070 GPU Computing Module	Fermi	July 25, 2011	1× GF100	575	448:56 :48:0:0 (14)	1150	—N/a	GDDR5	384	6	3000	144	No	1.030	0.5152	2.0	247	Internal PCIe GPU (full-height, dual-slot)
C2075 GPU Computing Module	Fermi	July 25, 2011	1× GF100	575	448:56 :48:0:0 (14)	1150	—N/a	GDDR5	384	6	3000	144	No	1.030	0.5152	2.0	225	Internal PCIe GPU (full-height, dual-slot)
M2070/M2070Q GPU Computing Module	Fermi	July 25, 2011	1× GF100	575	448:56 :48:0:0 (14)	1150	—N/a	GDDR5	384	6	3132	150.3	No	1.030	0.5152	2.0	225	Internal PCIe GPU (full-height, dual-slot)
M2090 GPU Computing Module	Fermi	July 25, 2011	1× GF110	650	512:64 :48:0:0 (16)	1300	—N/a	GDDR5	384	6	3700	177.6	No	1.331	0.6656	2.0	225	Internal PCIe GPU (full-height, dual-slot)
S2050 GPU Computing Server	Fermi	July 25, 2011	4× GF100	575	4× 448:56 :48:0:0 (14)	1150	—N/a	GDDR5	4× 384	4× 3	3000	4× 148.4	No	4.122	2.061	2.0	900	1U rack-mount external GPUs, connect via 2× PCIe (×8 or ×16)
S2070 GPU Computing Server	Fermi	July 25, 2011	4× GF100	575	4× 448:56 :48:0:0 (14)	1150	—N/a	GDDR5	4× 384	4× 6	3000	4× 148.4	No	4.122	2.061	2.0	900	1U rack-mount external GPUs, connect via 2× PCIe (×8 or ×16)
K10 GPU accelerator	Kepler	May 1, 2012	2× GK104	—N/a	2× 1536:138 :32:0:0 (8)	745	?	GDDR5	2× 256	2× 4	5000	2× 160	No	4.577	0.1907	3.0	225	Internal PCIe GPU (full-height, dual-slot)
K20 GPU accelerator	Kepler	November 12, 2012	1× GK110	—N/a	2496:208 :40:0:0 (13)	706	758	GDDR5	320	5	5200	208	No	3.524	1.175	3.5	225	Internal PCIe GPU (full-height, dual-slot)
K20X GPU accelerator	Kepler	November 12, 2012	1× GK110	—N/a	2688:224 :48:0:0 (14)	732	?	GDDR5	384	6	5200	250	No	3.935	1.312	3.5	235	Internal PCIe GPU (full-height, dual-slot)
K40 GPU accelerator	Kepler	October 8, 2013	1× GK110B	—N/a	2880:240 :48:0:0 (15)	745	875	GDDR5	384	12	6000	288	No	4.291–5.040	1.430–1.680	3.5	235	Internal PCIe GPU (full-height, dual-slot)
K80 GPU accelerator	Kepler	November 17, 2014	2× GK210	—N/a	2× 2496:208 :48:0:0 (13)	560	875	GDDR5	2× 384	2× 12	5000	2× 240	No	5.591–8.736	1.864–2.912	3.7	300	Internal PCIe GPU (full-height, dual-slot)
M4 GPU accelerator	Maxwell	November 10, 2015	1× GM206	—N/a	1024:64 :32:0:0 (8)	872	1072	GDDR5	128	4	5500	88	No	1.786–2.195	0.05581–0.06861	5.2	50–75	Internal PCIe GPU (half-height, single-slot)
M6 GPU accelerator	Maxwell	August 30, 2015	1× GM204-995-A1	—N/a	1536:96 :64:0:0 (12)	722	1051	GDDR5	256	8	4600	147.2	No	2.218–3.229	0.0693–0.1009	5.2	75–100	Internal MXM GPU
M10 GPU accelerator	Maxwell	May 18, 2016	4× GM107	—N/a	4× 640:40 :16:0:0 (5)	1033	?	GDDR5	4× 128	4× 8	5188	4× 83	No	5.289	0.1653	5.2	225	Internal PCIe GPU (full-height, dual-slot)
M40 GPU accelerator	Maxwell	November 10, 2015	1× GM200	—N/a	3072:192 :96:0:0 (24)	948	1114	GDDR5	384	12 or 24	6000	288	No	5.825–6.844	0.182–0.2139	5.2	250	Internal PCIe GPU (full-height, dual-slot)
M60 GPU accelerator	Maxwell	August 30, 2015	2× GM204-895-A1	—N/a	2× 2048:128 :64:0:0 (16)	899	1178	GDDR5	2× 256	2× 8	5000	2× 160	No	7.365–9.650	0.2301–0.3016	5.2	225–300	Internal PCIe GPU (full-height, dual-slot)
P4 GPU accelerator	Pascal	September 13, 2016	1× GP104	—N/a	2560:160 :64:0:0 (20)	810	1063	GDDR5	256	8	6000	192.0	No	4.147–5.443	0.1296–0.1701	6.1	50–75	PCIe card
P6 GPU accelerator	Pascal	March 24, 2017	1× GP104-995-A1	—N/a	2048:128 :64:0:0 (16)	1012	1506	GDDR5	256	16	3003	192.2	No	6.169	0.1928	6.1	90	MXM card
P40 GPU accelerator	Pascal	September 13, 2016	1× GP102	—N/a	3840:240 :96:0:0 (30)	1303	1531	GDDR5	384	24	7200	345.6	No	10.01–11.76	0.3127–0.3674	6.1	250	PCIe card
P100 GPU accelerator (mezzanine)	Pascal	April 5, 2016	1× GP100-890-A1	—N/a	3584:224 :96:0:0 (56)	1328	1480	HBM2	4096	16	1430	732	No	9.519–10.61	4.760–5.304	6.0	300	SXM card
P100 GPU accelerator (16 GB card)	Pascal	June 20, 2016	1× GP100	—N/a	3584:224 :96:0:0 (56)	1126	1303	HBM2	4096	16	1430	732	No	8.071‒9.340	4.036‒4.670	6.0	250	PCIe card
P100 GPU accelerator (12 GB card)	Pascal	June 20, 2016	1× GP100	—N/a	3584:224 :96:0:0 (56)	1126	1303	HBM2	3072	12	1430	549	No	8.071‒9.340	4.036‒4.670	6.0	250	PCIe card
V100 GPU accelerator (mezzanine)	Volta	May 10, 2017	1× GV100-895-A1	—N/a	5120:320 :128:640:0 (80)	Unknown	1455	HBM2	4096	16 or 32	1750	900	119.2	14.90	7.450	7.0	300	SXM card
V100 GPU accelerator (PCIe card)	Volta	June 21, 2017	1× GV100	—N/a	5120:320 :128:640:0 (80)	Unknown	1370	HBM2	4096	16 or 32	1750	900	112.2	14.03	7.014	7.0	250	PCIe card
V100 GPU accelerator (PCIe FHHL card)	Volta	March 27, 2018	1× GV100	—N/a	5120:320 :128:640:0 (80)	937	1290	HBM2	4096	16	1620	829.4	105.7	13.21	6.605	7.0	250	PCIe FHHL card
T4 GPU accelerator (PCIe card)	Turing	September 12, 2018	1× TU104-895-A1	—N/a	2560:160 :64:320:40 (40)	585	1590	GDDR6	256	16	5000	320	64.8	8.1	Unknown	7.5	70	PCIe card
A2 GPU accelerator (PCIe card)	Ampere	November 10, 2021	1× GA107	—N/a	1280:40 :32:40:10 (10)	1440	1770	GDDR6	128	16	6252	200	18.12	4.531	0.14	8.6	40–60	PCIe card (half height, single-slot)
A10 GPU accelerator (PCIe card)	Ampere	April 12, 2021	1× GA102-890-A1	—N/a	9216:288 :96:288:72 (72)	885	1695	GDDR6	384	24	6252	600	125.0	31.24	0.976	8.6	150	PCIe card (single-slot)
A16 GPU accelerator (PCIe card)	Ampere	April 12, 2021	4× GA107	—N/a	4× 1280:40 :32:40:10 (10)	885	1695	GDDR6	4× 128	4× 16	7242	4× 200	4x 18.43	4× 4.608	1.085	8.6	250	PCIe card (dual-slot)
A30 GPU accelerator (PCIe card)	Ampere	April 12, 2021	1× GA100	—N/a	3584:224 :96:224:0 (56)	930	1440	HBM2	3072	24	1215	933.1	165.1	10.32	5.161	8.0	165	PCIe card (dual-slot)
A40 GPU accelerator (PCIe card)	Ampere	October 5, 2020	1× GA102	—N/a	10752:336 :112:336:84 (84)	1305	1740	GDDR6	384	48	7248	695.8	149.7	37.42	1.168	8.6	300	PCIe card (dual-slot)
A100 GPU accelerator (PCIe card)	Ampere	May 14, 2020	1× GA100-883AA-A1	—N/a	6912:432 :160:432:0 (108)	765	1410	HBM2	5120	40 or 80	1215	1555	312.0	19.5	9.7	8.0	250	PCIe card (dual-slot)
H100 GPU accelerator (PCIe card)	Hopper	March 22, 2022	1× GH100	—N/a	14592:456 :24:456:0 (114)	1065	1755 CUDA 1620 TC	HBM2E	5120	80	1000	2039	756.4	51.2	25.6	9.0	350	PCIe card (dual-slot)
H100 GPU accelerator (SXM card)	Hopper	March 22, 2022	1× GH100	—N/a	16896:528 :24:528:0 (132)	1065	1980 CUDA 1830 TC	HBM3	5120	64 or 80 or 96	1500	3352	989.4	66.9	33.5	9.0	700	SXM card
H200 GPU accelerator (PCIe card)	Hopper	November 18, 2024	1× GH100	—N/a	16896:528 :24:528:0 (132)	1365	1785	HBM3E	5120	141	1313	3360	835	60.32	30.16	9.0	600	PCIe card (dual-slot)
H200 GPU accelerator (SXM card)	Hopper	November 18, 2024	1× GH100	—N/a	16896:528 :24:528:0 (132)	1590	1980	HBM3E	5120	141	1313	3360	989	66.91	33.45	9.0	700	SXM card
H800 GPU accelerator (SXM card)	Hopper	March 21, 2023	1× GH100	—N/a	16896:528 :24:528:0 (132)	1095	1755	HBM3	5120	80	1313	3360	—N/a	59.3	29.65	9.0	700	SXM card
L40 GPU accelerator	Ada Lovelace	October 13, 2022	1× AD102	—N/a	18176:568 :192:568:142 (142)	735	2490	GDDR6	384	48	2250	864	362.1	90.52	1.414	8.9	300	PCIe card (dual-slot)
L40S GPU accelerator	Ada Lovelace	August 8, 2023	1× AD102	—N/a	18176:568 :192:568:142 (142)	1110	2520	GDDR6	384	48	2250	864	362.05	91.6	1.431	8.9	350	PCIe card (dual-slot)
L4 GPU accelerator	Ada Lovelace	March 21, 2023	1x AD104	—N/a	7424:240 :80:240:0 (60)	795	2040	GDDR6	192	24	1563	300	121.0	30.3	0.49	8.9	72	HHHL single slot PCIe card
B100 GPU accelerator	Blackwell	Never Released	2× GB102	—N/a	16896:528 :24:528:0 (132)	700	975	HBM3E	8192	192	2000	8000	131.8	32.95	16.47	10.1	1000	SXM card
B200 GPU accelerator	Blackwell	November 2024	2× GB100	—N/a	18944:592 :24:592:0 (148)	700	1965 CUDA 1830 TC	HBM3E	8192	180	2000	8000	1191.2	74.45	37.22	10.0	1000	SXM card
B300 GPU accelerator	Blackwell	Sep 11, 2025	2× GB110	—N/a	18944:592 :24:592:0 (148)	1665	2032	HBM3E	8192	288	2000	8000	1231.8	76.99	1.2029	10.3	1400	SXM card

Notes

- A10G GPU accelerator (PCIe card)-300W TDP, Ampere, 24GB GDDR6@600GB/s, 80 RT Cores

== Console/handheld GPUs ==
Model name	Launch	Code name	Fab (nm)	Bus interface	Core clock (MHz)	Memory clock (MHz)	Core config^{1,2,3}	Memory				Fillrate				Processing power (GFLOPS)^{3}				Deep Learning	Latest supported API version			
Model name	Launch	Code name	Fab (nm)	Bus interface	Core clock (MHz)	Memory clock (MHz)	Core config^{1,2,3}	Size (MiB)	Bandwidth (GB/s)	Bus type	Bus width (bit)	MOps/s	MTexels/s	MPixels/s	MTri/s	Half precision	Single precision	Ray tracing performance	Tensor compute (FP16) (Dense)	TOPS (INT8) (Dense)	Direct3D	OpenGL	Vulkan	Other
XGPU (Xbox)	November 15, 2001	NV2A	TSMC 150 nm	Integrated	233	200	4:2:8:4^{1}	64	6.4	DDR	128	5,800	1,864	932	116.5	-	13.9	N/A	N/A	N/A	8.1	1.4	N/A	N/A
RSX (PS3)	November 11, 2006	G70	Toshiba 90/65/40 nm/28 nm	FlexIO	500	650	24:8:24:8^{1}	256; 256	15 (write); 20 (read); 20.8	XDR; GDDR3	128	12,000	12,000	4,000	250	-	192 + 153.6 (w/Cell SPUs)	N/A	N/A	N/A	N/A	ES 1.1 w/Cg	N/A	N/A
NX-SoC (Nintendo Switch)	March 3, 2017	GM20B	TSMC 20 nm	Integrated	384.0 (undocked); 768.0 (docked)	1333 (undocked); 1600 (docked)	256:16:16^{2}	4,096	21.3 (undocked) 25.6 (docked)	LPDDR4	64	196,608 (undocked); 393,216 (docked)	6,144 (undocked); 12,288 (docked)	6,144 (undocked); 12,288 (docked)	384/768	393.2 (undocked); 786.4 (docked)	196.6 (undocked); 393.2 (docked)	N/A	N/A	N/A	N/A	4.6; ES 3.2	1.3	Nvidia NVN
NX-SoC (Nintendo Switch)	August 30, 2019	GM20B	TSMC 16 nm	Integrated	384.0 (undocked); 768.0 (docked)	1333 (undocked); 1600 (docked)	256:16:16^{2}	4,096	21.3 (undocked) 25.6 (docked)	LPDDR4X	64	196,608 (undocked); 393,216 (docked)	6,144 (undocked); 12,288 (docked)	6,144 (undocked); 12,288 (docked)	384/768	393.2 (undocked); 786.4 (docked)	196.6 (undocked); 393.2 (docked)	N/A	N/A	N/A	N/A	4.6; ES 3.2	1.3	Nvidia NVN
Drake (Nintendo Switch 2)	June 5, 2025	GA10F (Ampere)	Samsung 8 nm	Integrated	561 (undocked) 1007.25 (docked)	2133 (undocked); 3200 (docked)	1536(12):48:16:12:48^{3}	12,288	68.26 (undocked) 102.4 (docked)	LPDDR5X	128	1,723,400 (undocked) 3,094,272 (docked)	26,928 (undocked) 48,348 (docked)	8,976 (undocked) 16,116 (docked)	561/1007.25	3,446.8 (undocked) 6,188.6 (docked)	1,723.4 (undocked) 3,094.3 (docked)	3,443 (undocked) 6,181 (docked)	6,894 (undocked) 12,377 (docked)	13,787 (undocked) 24,754 (docked)	N/A	N/A	1.4	Nvidia NVN

- ^{1} Pixel shaders: vertex shaders: texture mapping units: render output units
- ^{2} Unified shaders: Texture mapping units : Render output units
- ^{3} Unified shaders (SM count): Texture mapping units : Render output units : Ray tracing cores : Tensor Core

== See also ==
- nouveau (software)
- Scalable Link Interface (SLI)
- TurboCache
- Tegra
- Apple M1
- CUDA
- Nvidia NVDEC
- Nvidia NVENC
- Qualcomm Adreno
- ARM Mali
- Comparison of Nvidia nForce chipsets
- List of AMD graphics processing units
- List of Intel graphics processing units
- List of eponyms of Nvidia GPU microarchitectures
- Imageon by ATI (Now AMD)
